= List of nature deities =

A Greek dryad depicted in a painting

In religion, a nature deity is a deity in charge of forces of nature, such as water, biological processes, or weather. These deities can also govern natural features such as mountains, trees, or volcanoes. Accepted in animism, pantheism, panentheism, polytheism, deism, totemism, shamanism, Taoism, Hinduism, and paganism, the nature deity can embody a number of archetypes including mother goddess, Mother Nature, or lord of the animals.

== African ==
=== Akan mythology ===
- Asase Yaa, Mother of the Dead and the goddess of the harsh earth and truth
- Asase Afua, the goddess of the lush earth, fertility, love, procreation and farming
- Bia, personification of the Bia River and god of the wilderness and wild animals
- Tano, personification of the Tano River and god of the river and thunder

=== Bantu mythology ===
- Jengu, Sawabantu and Duala water spirits
- Nyambe, Bantu Supreme deity and god of the sun
- Nzambi, Bakongo Sky Father and god of the sun
- Nzambici, Bakongo Sky Mother and goddess of the moon and earth
- Simbi, Bakongo nature spirits of the water and forest

=== Egyptian mythology ===
- Ash, god of the oasis and the vineyards of the western Nile Delta
- Geb, god of earth
- Nut, sky goddess and sister and wife of Geb

=== Igbo mythology ===
- Ala, Igbo alusi, goddess of the earth, morality, fertility, and creativity
- Amadioha, Igbo alusi, god of thunder and lightning
- Anyanwu, Igbo alusi, sun goddess of good fortune, knowledge, and wisdom

=== Voodoo mythology ===
- Mawu-Lisa, Dahomey goddess of creation, the sun, and the moon
- Xɛvioso, Dahomey god of thunder

=== Yoruba mythology ===
- Aja, Yoruba orisha of whirlwinds, the forest, forest animals, and herbal healers
- Ayé, personification of the Earth
- Babalú-Ayé, orisha of the Earth, healing and disease
- Erinlẹ, orisha of nature, the Earth and the Erinle River
- Ọba, orisha of fidelity, passing of time and life, and the Oba River
- Oko, orisha of farming, harvest and of hunting
- Ọsanyin, orisha of the forest, herbs, and healing
- Oshosi, orisha, patron of the forest and of hunting
- Oshun, orisha of sweet water, purity, fertility, love, and sensuality
- Ọya, orisha of storms, wind and the Niger River

=== Zulu mythology ===
- iNyanga, Zulu moon goddess
- Nomhoyi, Zulu goddess of rivers
- Nomkhubulwane, Zulu goddess mother of fertility, rain, agriculture, rainbow, and beer
- Unsondo, Zulu god of the sky, sun, thunder, and earthquakes

== American ==
=== Aztec mythology ===
- Xochipilli, god of art, games, beauty, dance, flowers, maize, and song
- Xochiquetzal, goddess of fertility, beauty, female sexuality, protection of young mothers, pregnancy, childbirth, vegetation, flowers, and the crafts of women
- Tonantzin, mother goddess
- Chicomecōātl, a goddess of agriculture

=== Brazilian mythology/Guarani mythology ===
- Curupira, a powerful demon or forest spirit and guardian of nature

=== Haitian Vodou ===
- Baron Samedi, loa of the dead
- Grand Bois, loa associated with trees, plants and herbs
- L'inglesou, loa who lives in the wild areas of Haiti and kills anyone who offends him
- Loco, loa associated with healers and plants, especially trees

=== Inca mythology ===
- Pachamama, fertility goddess who presides over planting, harvesting and earthquakes

=== Maya mythology ===
- Yum Kaax, god of agriculture, wild plants and animals

=== Native American mythology ===
- Asintmah, Athabaskan earth and nature goddess, and the first woman to walk the earth
- Ngen, Mapuche spirits of nature

== Asian ==
=== Chinese mythology ===
- Dou Mu Niang Niang, Mother Goddess of the Big Dipper
- Tai Sui, Star deities of sixty years cycle
- Chang'e, moon goddess
- Lei Gong, god of thunder
- Hou Tu Niang Niang, Mother Earth and Overlord of all Tu Di Gong
- Tu Di Gong, earth deity of a specific locality and nearby human communities
- Gonggong, ancient god of water
- Zhurong, ancient god of fire
- Hebo, god of Yellow River
- San Shan Guo Wang, lords of the Three Mountains in Southern China

=== Hinduism ===
- Yaksha, are a broad class of nature spirits. Their female counterpart are known as Yakshini.
- Prithvi or Bhumi, goddess regarded as "Mother Earth"; Sanskrit for Earth
- Agni, god of fire
- Varuna, god of oceans
- Vayu, god of wind
- Indra, god of rain, lightning and thunders
- Aranyani, goddess of the forests and the animals that dwell within it

=== Japanese mythology ===
- Amaterasu, goddess of the sun
- Izanagi, forefather of the gods, god of creation and life and first male
- Izanami, Izanagi's wife and sister, goddess of creation and death, first female
- Konohanasakuya-hime, the blossom princess and symbol of delicate earthly life
- Shinigami, god of death
- Suijin, god of water
- Fūjin, god of wind
- Kagu-tsuchi, god of fire
- Susanoo, god of storms, (fertility in Izumo legends), younger brother to Amaterasu and Tsukuyomi
- Tsukuyomi, god of the moon and oceans, younger brother of Amaterasu and older brother of Susanoo

=== Korean mythology ===
- Dangun, god-king of Gojoseon, god of the mountain
- Dokkaebi, nature spirits
- Lady Saso, goddess of the mountain
- Jacheongbi, goddess of the grain, agriculture, harvest, growth, and nourishment
- Jeonggyun Moju, mother of Suro of Geumgwan Gaya and Ijinashi of Daegaya, goddess of the mountain
- Jik, god of grains
- Sa, god of the earth
- Sansin, local mountain gods

=== Philippine mythology ===
- Amihan, Tagalog god of the monsoon
- Apúng Sinukuan (Maria Sinukuan), Kapampangan mountain goddess associated with Mount Arayat
- Dumakulem, god of mountains
- Dumangan, a Tagalog god of good harvest
- Lakapati or Ikapati, goddess of cultivated land and agriculture
- Dayang Masalanta (Maria Makiling), Tagalog mountain goddess associated with Mount Makiling
- Mayari, goddess of the moon
- Kan-Laon, Visayan god of time associated with the volcano Kanlaon
- Tala, Tagalog goddess of the morning and evening star

=== Vietnamese mythology ===
- Ông Trời, god of the heaven/sky and king of the gods
- Mẫu Thượng Thiên, goddess of the heavens/skies
- Thiên Y A Na, the goddess has the same job as the Mẫu Thượng Thiên
- Mẫu Thượng Ngàn, goddess of the mountains and forests
- Tản Viên Sơn Thánh, god of Ba Vì mountain range
- Mẫu Thoải, the goddess who governs all things related to water
- Mẫu Địa, goddess of the earth
- Lạc Long Quân, one of the Long Vươngs at the head of the Water Palace

=== Western Asian ===
==== Arab mythology ====
- Dhat-Badan, Yemeni and Horn African goddess of the oasis

==== Armenian mythology ====
- Ara the Handsome, a dying-and-rising agricultural deity
- Aralez, winged dog-like creatures with the ability to resurrect the dead by licking wounds
- Areg (Arev) or Ar, god of the Sun
- Astłik, deity of fertility and love
- Tsovinar, also known as "Nar of the Sea", goddess of waters and the ocean
- Mihr, cognate with the Mithra and god of the sun and light
- Spandaramet, chthonic goddess of fertility, vineyards, and the underworld
- Vishap, a dragon closely associated with water

==== Hittite mythology ====
- Irpitiga, lord of the earth
- Sarruma, god of the mountains

==== Mesopotamian mythology ====
- Abu, minor Sumerian god of plants
- Damu, vegetation god
- Emesh, Sumerian god of vegetation and abundance
- Kishar, goddess representing the earth
- Ningishzida, vegetation god
- Ninhursag, Sumerian mother goddess associated with the earth and fertility
- Ningikuga, Sumerian goddess of reeds and marshes
- Ua-Ildak, Babylonian and Akkadian goddess responsible for pastures and poplar trees
- Ki, an earth goddess
- Enten, god of fertility and agriculture

==== Persian mythology ====
- Spenta Armaiti, goddess of earth
- Ameretat, goddess of vegetation
- Haurvatat, goddess associated with water
- Anahita, goddess of waters
- Tishtrya, god of rain and lightning
- Apam Napat, god of waters

==== Turco-Mongol ====
- Umay, the goddess of nature, love and fertility in Turkic mythology. Also known as Yer Ana.
- İye, deities or spirits or natural assets.
- Baianai, the god of the forest, animals, and hunt in Turkic mythology.
- Ukulan, the god of water in Turkic mythology

== European ==
=== Albanian mythology ===
- Zana e Malit, Albanian goddess of forests, Rivers, streams, nature, animals

=== Baltic mythology ===
- Medeina, Lithuanian goddess of forests, trees, and animals
- Zemes māte, goddess of the earth

=== Celtic mythology ===
- Abnoba, Gaulish goddess associated with forests and rivers
- Artio, Gaulish bear goddess of the wilderness
- Arduinna, goddess of the Ardennes forest region
- Cernunnos, god associated with horned male animals, produce, and fertility
- Druantia, hypothetical Gallic tree goddess proposed by Robert Graves in his 1948 study The White Goddess; popular with Neopagans.
- Erecura Romanized-Celtic Goddess of grain and bread (wife of Dis Pater).
- Nantosuelta, Gaulish goddess of nature, the earth, fire, and fertility
- Sucellus, god of agriculture, forests, and alcoholic drinks
- Viridios, god of vegetation, rebirth, and agriculture, possibly cognate with the Green Man
- Sínann, Irish goddess, embodiment of the River Shannon, the longest river on Ireland, and a goddess of wisdom

=== English mythology ===
- Apple Tree Man, the spirit of the oldest apple tree in an orchard
- Churnmilk Peg, female guardian spirit of unripe nut thickets
- Melsh Dick is the male counterpart to Churnmilk Peg

=== Etruscan mythology ===
- Fufluns, god of plant life, happiness, wine, health, and growth in all things
- Selvans, god of the woodlands
- Artumes, goddess of the hunt, woodlands, the night, and the wild

=== Finnish mythology ===
- Lempo, god of wilderness and archery
- Tapio, god and ruler of forests
- Mielikki, goddess of forests and the hunt. Wife of Tapio.

=== Georgian mythology ===
- Dali, goddess of mountain animals such as ibex and deer

=== Germanic mythology ===
- Ēostre or Ostara, the goddess of spring
- Fjörgyn, the female personification of the earth. She is also the mother of the goddess Frigg and, very rarely, mother of Thor
- Freyja, goddess of fertility, gold, death, love, beauty, war and magic
- Freyr, god of fertility, rain, sunlight, life and summer
- Iðunn the goddess of spring who guards the apples that keep the gods eternally young; wife of the god Bragi
- Jörð, personification of the earth and the mother of Thor
- Nerthus, goddess of the earth, called by the Romans Terra Mater
- Njörð, god of the sea, fishing, and fertility
- Rán, goddess of the sea, storms, and death
- Skaði, goddess of mountains, skiing, winter, archery and hunting
- Sif, goddess of earth, fertility, and the harvest
- Thor, god of thunder, lightning, weather, oak trees, and fertility
- Ullr, god of hunting, archery, skiing, and mountains

==== Germanic folklore ====
- Nøkken, male water spirit
- Elf, beautiful, fairy-like creature that lives in the forest and streams

=== Greek mythology ===
- Anthousai, flower nymphs
- Aphrodite, goddess of love, beauty, pleasure, and fertility
- Apollo, god of the sun, light, healing, poetry and music, and archery
- Aristaeus, god of shepherds, cheesemaking, beekeeping, honey, honey-mead, olive growing, oil milling, medicinal herbs, hunting, and the Etesian winds
- Artemis, goddess of the hunt, the dark, the light, the moon, wild animals, nature, wilderness, childbirth, virginity, fertility, young girls, and health and plague in women and childhood
- Aurae, nymphs of the breezes
- Chloris, goddess of flowers
- Cronus, god of the harvest
- Cybele, Phrygian goddess of the fertile earth and wild animals
- Demeter, goddess of the harvest, crops, the fertility of the earth, grains, and the seasons
- Dionysus, god of wine, vegetation, pleasure, madness, and festivity. The Roman equivalent is Bacchus.
- Dryads, tree and forest nymphs
- Epimeliades, nymphs of highland pastures and protectors of sheep flocks
- Gaia, primal mother goddess and goddess of the earth and its personification
- Hamadryades, oak tree dryads
- Hegemone, goddess of plants, specifically making them bloom and bear fruit as they were supposed to
- Helios, Titan-god of the sun
- Horae, goddesses of the seasons and the natural portions of time
- Meliae, nymphs of honey and the ash tree
- Nymphs, nature spirits
- Naiades, fresh water nymphs
- Nereids, salt-water nymphs
- Nyx, Primordial goddess and personification of night
- Oceanides, fresh water nymphs
- Oreades, mountain nymphs
- Oxylus, god of forests & mountains
- Pan, god of shepherds, flocks, mountain wilds, and rustic music
- Persephone (Kore), goddess of spring growth
- Physis, primeval goddess of nature
- Rhea, goddess of fertility, motherhood, and the mountain wilds
- Satyrs, rustic nature spirits
- Selene, Titan-goddess of the moon

=== Mari ===
- Mlande, god of the earth
- Mlande-Ava, goddess of the earth

=== Nordic folklore ===
- Rå, Skogsrå, Hulder, beautiful, female forest spirits

=== Roman mythology ===
- Bacchus – god of wine, nature, pleasure and festivity; equivalent to the Greek god Dionysus
- Ceres, goddess of growing plants and motherly relationships; equivalent to the Greek goddess Demeter
- Diana, goddess of the hunt, wild animals, wilderness and the moon; equivalent to the Greek goddess Artemis
- Erecura Romanized-Celtic Goddess of grain and bread (wife of Dis Pater).
- Faunus, horned god of the forest, plains and fields
- Feronia, goddess associated with wildlife, fertility, health and abundance
- Flora, goddess of flowers and the spring; equivalent to the Greek goddess Chloris
- Fufluns, god of plant life, happiness and health and growth in all things
- Liber, cognate for Bacchus/Dionysus
- Nemestrinus, god of the forests and woods
- Ops, goddess of fertility and the earth
- Pilumnus, nature god who ensured children grew properly and stayed healthy
- Pomona, goddess of fruit trees, gardens and orchards
- Silvanus, tutelary spirit or deity of woods and fields and protector of forests
- Terra, primeval goddess personifying the earth; equivalent to the Greek goddess Gaia

=== Slavic mythology ===
- Berstuk, evil Wendish god of the forest
- Jarilo, god of vegetation, fertility, spring, war and harvest
- Leshy, a tutelary deity of the forests.
- Porewit, god of the woods, who protected lost voyagers and punished those who mistreated the forest
- Veles, god of earth, waters and the underworld
- Mokosh, East-Slavic goddess of nature

== Oceanian ==
=== Māori mythology ===
- Papatuanuku, the earth mother
- Ranginui, the sky father
- Ruaumoko, god of volcanoes and seasons
- Tāne, god of forests and of birds

=== Micronesian mythology ===
- Nei Tituaabine, Kiribati goddess of trees

=== Toraja ===
- Indo' Ongon-Ongon, goddess of earthquakes
- Pong Banggai di Rante, earth goddess

== See also ==
- List of deities by classification
- List of tree deities
- Ekendriya
- Master of Animals
- Plant soul
- Potnia Theron
