= Mẫu Địa =

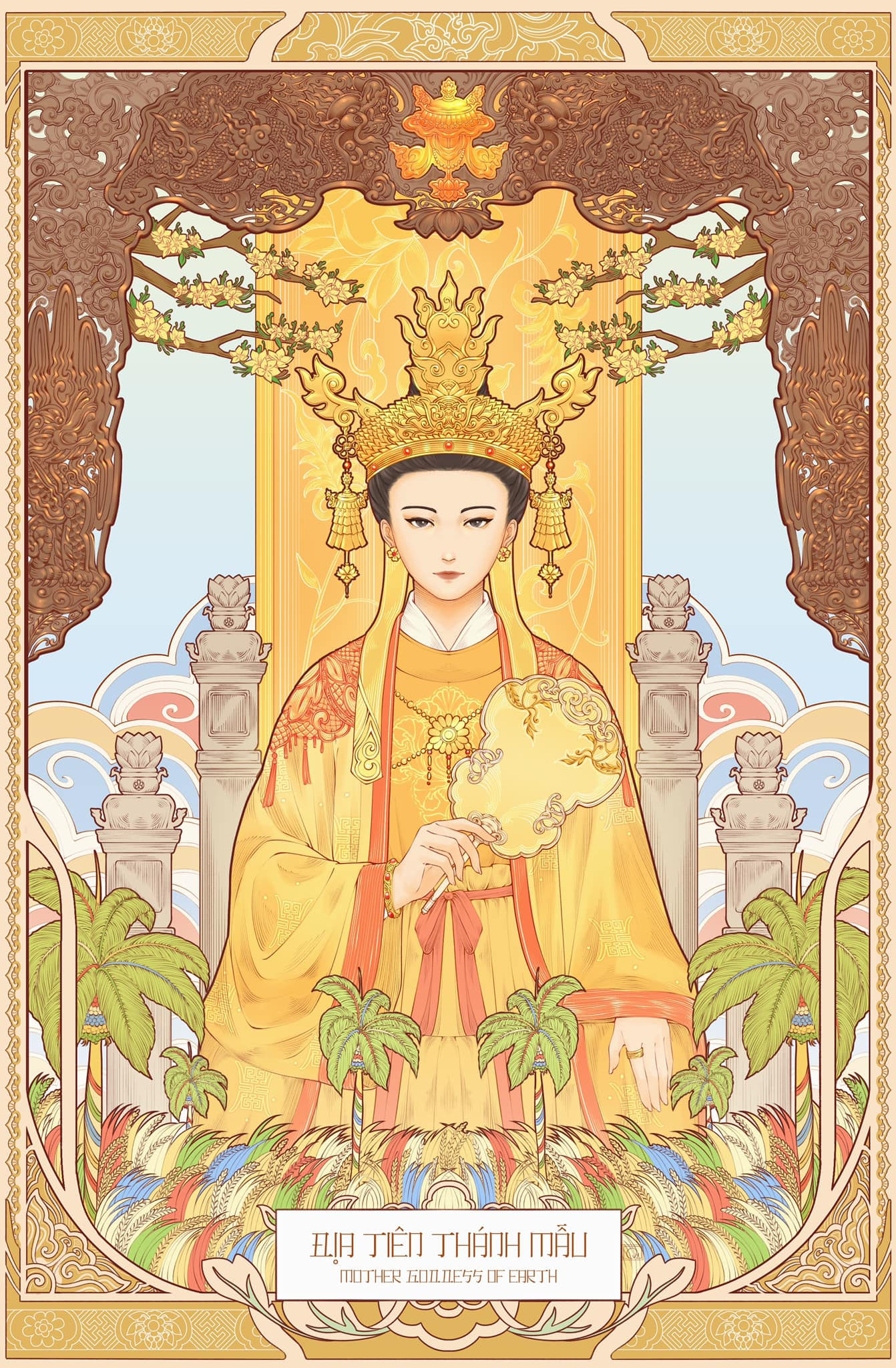
A portrait of the Mẫu Địa in the Lê dynasty's costumes.

Mẫu Địa Tiên (Chữ Hán: 母地仙, Mother Goddess of Earth) (not to be mistaken with Quảng Cung or Phật Mẫu Diêu Trì), Mẫu Địa (Chữ Hán: 母地) also known as Mẫu Địa Phủ or Lục Cung Thánh Mẫu (Chữ Hán: 陆宮聖母) is one of the Mother Goddesses in Đạo Mẫu (Mother Goddess religion), an indigenous religion of Vietnam. She governs the Earth Palace, one of the Four Palaces which otherwise include Heaven Palace, Mountains and Forests Palace and Water Palace.

The devotees of Đạo Mẫu believe that Mother Goddess Liễu Hạnh is Mẫu Địa Tiên herself. As the representative of Mẫu Thiên Tiên (Mother Goddess of Heaven) on Earth and Mẫu Địa Tiên, she is the primary goddess of Đạo Mẫu.

Because Mẫu Địa Phủ governs the Earth Palace, she is associated with the token color of yellow. Each palace has a representative color. Red is Mẫu Thượng Thiên, Green is Mẫu Thượng Ngàn, White is Mẫu Thoải and Yellow is Mẫu Địa Tiên.
