= Đạo Mẫu =

Shaman worship of mother goddesses in Vietnam

A modern impression of the pantheon of Four Palaces

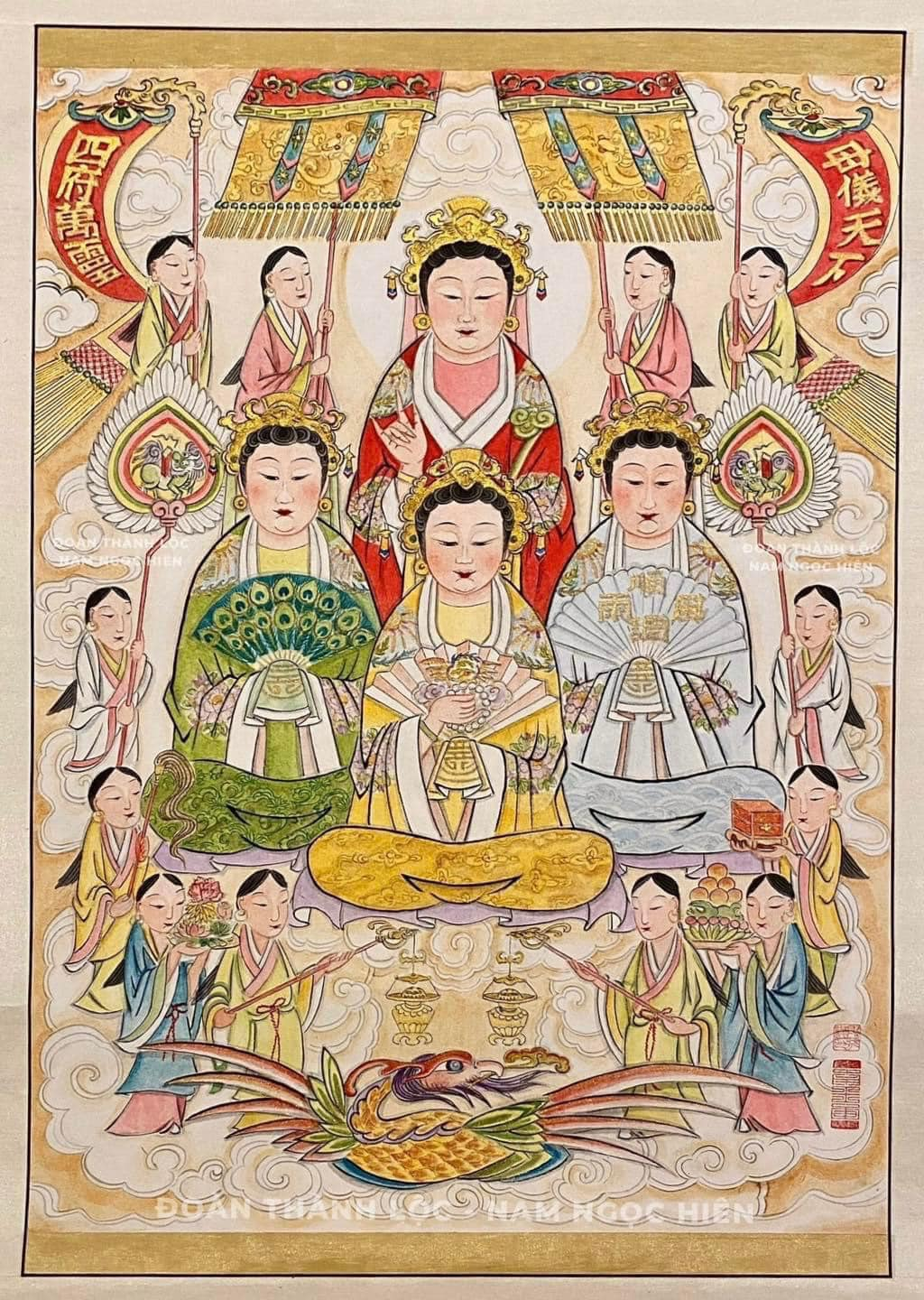
Modern painting Chúng Dân Chi Mẫu portraying the four Mother Goddesses

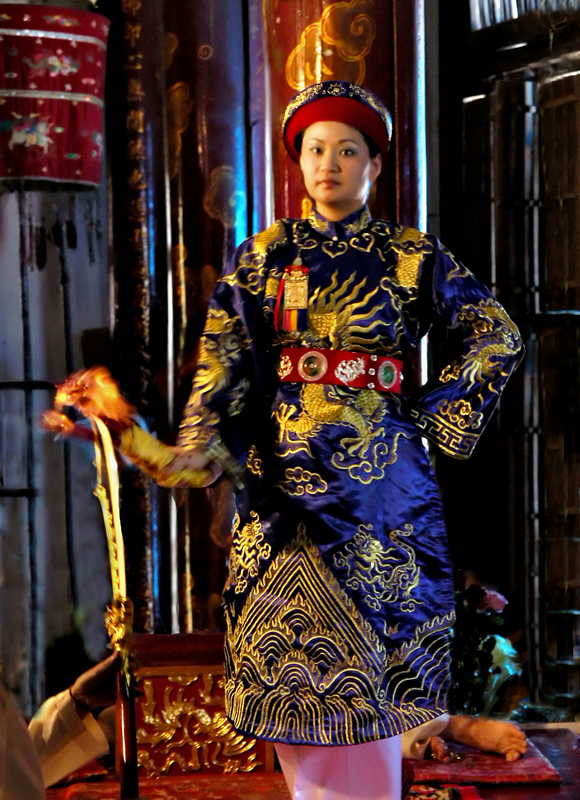
A thanh đồng holding a lên đồng aka hầu bóng (lit. 'serving the reflections') ritual in a shrine.

Đạo Mẫu (Vietnamese: [ɗâːwˀ mə̌wˀ], 道母) is the worship of mother goddesses which was established in Vietnam in the 16th century. This worship is a branch of Vietnamese folk religion but is more shamanic in nature. Đạo is a Sino-Vietnamese word for "religion," similar to the Chinese term dao meaning "path," while Mẫu means "mother" and is loaned from Middle Chinese /məuX/.

While scholars like Ngô Đức Thịnh propose that it represents a systematic worship of mother goddesses, Đạo Mẫu draws together fairly disparate beliefs and practices. These include the worship of goddesses such as Thiên Y A Na, Bà Chúa Xứ "Lady of the Realm", Bà Chúa Kho "Lady of the Storehouse", and Princess Liễu Hạnh, legendary figures like Âu Cơ, the Trưng Sisters (Hai Bà Trưng), and Lady Triệu (Bà Triệu), as well as the branch Four Palaces.

== Practices ==
=== Serving the reflections (hầu bóng) ===
The most prominent ritual of Đạo Mẫu is the ceremony of hầu bóng (lit. 'serving the reflections'), in which a priest or priestess mimics the deities by dressing and acting like them. Many people mistake that hầu bóng is a form of mediumship ritual — known in Vietnam as lên đồng — much as practiced in other parts of Asia, such as South China, among the Mon people of Myanmar, and some communities in India; however, that is not correct. Although some of the priests and priestesses of Đạo Mẫu are believed to have the ability of spirit mediumship, this is a different practice entirely. The priest is in full control of their body during hầu bóng. A successful ceremony is one in which the priest feels the deities' essences but it does not mean the deities' spirits enter the priest's mortal body. As a religious leader authorised to perform the sacred rituals of a religion, especially as a mediatory agent between humans and one or more deities, the thanh đồng in Đạo Mẫu is more of the equivalent of a priest rather than a medium or a shaman.

The worshiping of the Mother Goddesses contributes to the appreciation of women in society. Recognized by UNESCO, this Vietnamese ritual was inscribed on the Representative List in December 2016.

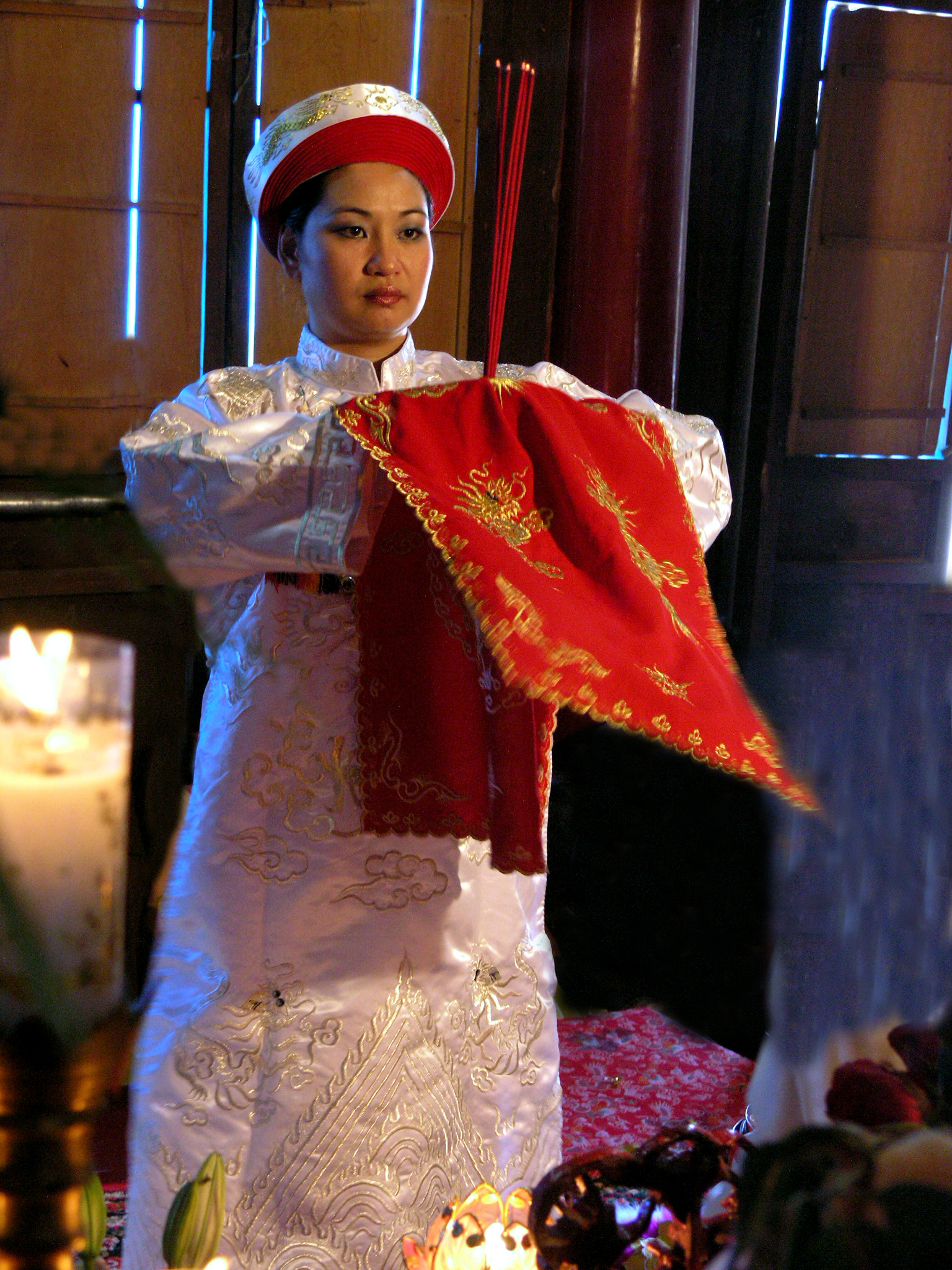
The thanh đồng is performing a certain ritual before performing the lên đồng ritual

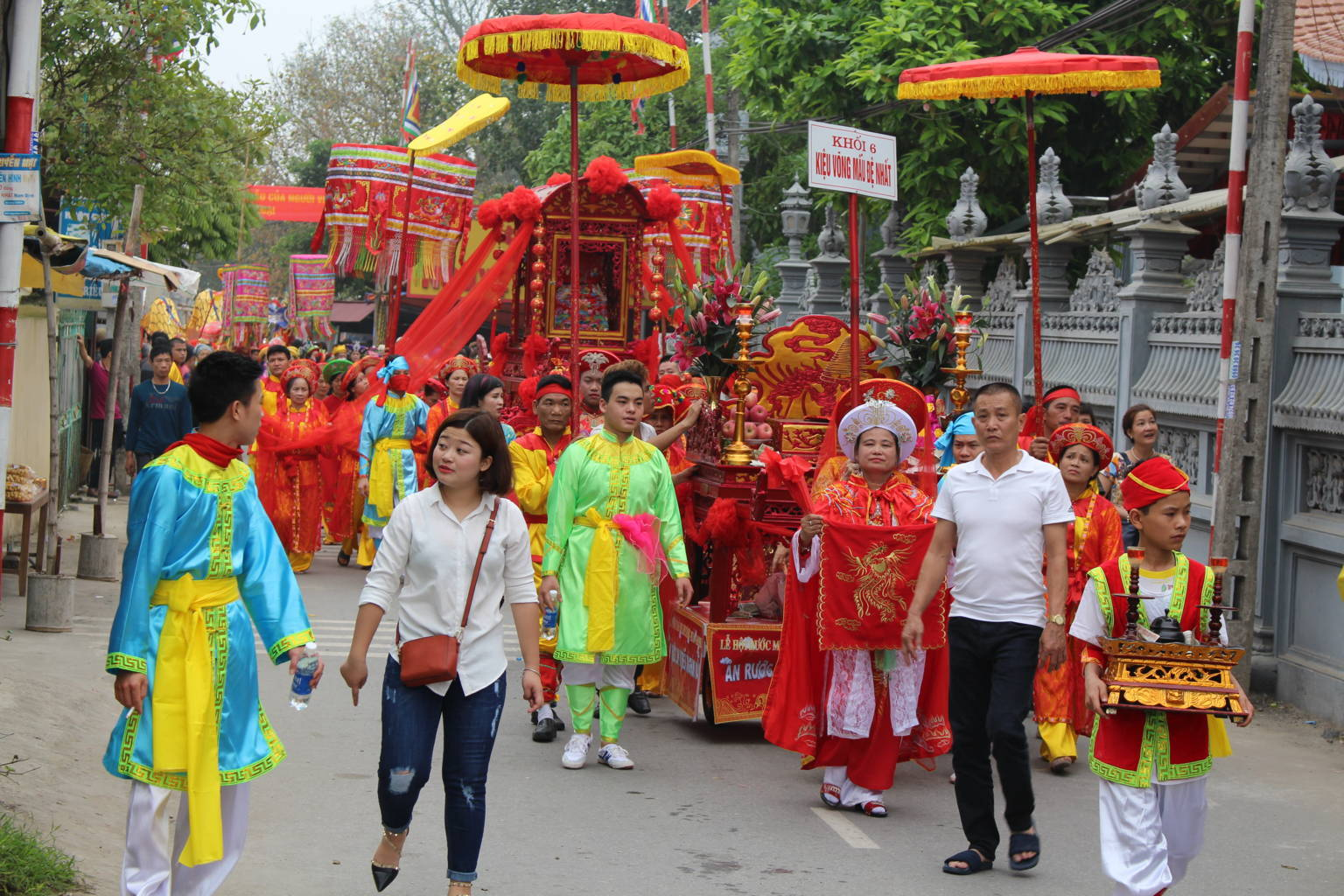
Ceremonial procession of Bà Chúa Liễu and Four Palaces in Phủ Dầy

Although the Vietnamese government had initially proscribed the practice of such rituals, deeming them to be superstitions, they relented in 1987, once again permitting their practice.

== Denominations ==
=== Four Palaces (Tứ Phủ) ===
The most prominent form of Đạo Mẫu is Four Palaces (Tứ Phủ), which worships a hierarchical pantheon of Vietnamese indigenous deities with a strong influence from historical figures, Taoism and Buddhism. Four Palaces is the most common in the North. Other forms in different areas have also developed an interference with other local beliefs. The name means "Four Palaces", which includes the four realms Heaven, Mountains, Water and Earth.

==== Mother Goddesses (Thánh Mẫu) ====
According to the official scripture of the Four Palaces, the Mother Goddesses of the Four Palaces denomination include:

- First Mother Goddess of Heaven, Mother Goddess of Infinite Heavens, Princess Cửu Trùng Thanh Vân [九重青雲公主]. Vietnamese: Mẫu Đệ Nhất Thiên Tiên, Mẫu Cửu Trùng Thiên, Cửu Trùng Thanh Vân Công Chúa
- Second Mother Goddess of Earth, Primary Mother Goddess, Princess Quỳnh Hoa Liễu Hạnh [瓊花柳杏公主]. Vietnamese: Mẫu Đệ Nhị Địa Tiên, Thánh Mẫu Thần Chủ, Quỳnh Hoa Liễu Hạnh Công Chúa
- Third Mother Goddess of Water, Mother Goddess of Water, Princess Bạch Ngọc Xích Lân [白玉赤鱗公主]. Vietnamese: Mẫu Đệ Tam Thuỷ Tiên, Mẫu Thoải, Bạch Ngọc Xích Lân Công Chúa
- Fourth Mother Goddess of Mountain, Mother Goddess of Mountain, Princess Lê Mại Bạch Anh [黎邁白英公主]. Vietnamese: Mẫu Đệ Tứ Nhạc Tiên, Mẫu Thượng Ngàn, Lê Mại Bạch Anh Công Chúa

==== Divine Courtiers (Thánh Chầu) ====
There are 12 positions in the rank of the Divine Courtiers. While the first four Divine Courtiers attend to the specific Mother Goddesses and represent their own Palace, the other Courtiers govern an area.

1. First Courtier, Imperial Commissioner of Heaven Palace. Vietnamese: Chầu Đệ Nhất Thượng Thiên Khâm Sai

2. Second Courtier, Imperial Commissioner of Mountain Palace. Vietnamese: Chầu Đệ Nhị Thượng Ngàn Khâm Sai

3. Third Courtier, Imperial Commissioner of Water Palace. Vietnamese: Chầu Đệ Tam Thuỷ Cung Khâm Sai

4. Fourth Courtier, Imperial Commissioner of Earth Palace. Vietnamese: Chầu Đệ Tứ Địa Cung Khâm Sai

5. Fifth Courtier of the Lân Stream. Vietnamese: Chầu Năm Suối Lân

6. Sixth Courtier of Femininity. Vietnamese: Chầu Sáu Lục Cung

7. Seventh Courtier of Kim Giao. Vietnamese: Chầu Bảy Kim Giao

8. Eighth Courtier of Bát Nàn. Vietnamese: Chầu Tám Bát Nàn

9. Ninth Courtier of Nine Wells. Vietnamese: Chầu Chín Cửu Tỉnh

10. Tenth Courtier of Đồng Mỏ. Vietnamese: Chầu Mười Đồng Mỏ

11. Little Courtier of Bắc Lệ. Vietnamese: Chầu Bé Bắc Lệ

12. Local Courtiers. Vietnamese: Chư vị Chầu Bản Cảnh

==== Divine Mistresses (Thánh Cô) ====
Similar to the 12 Divine Courtiers, there are 12 positions in the rank of the Divine Mistresses. While most Divine Mistresses attend to the specific Mother Goddesses or Divine Courtier, some other Mistresses protect an area.

1. First Mistress of Heaven. Vietnamese: Cô Cả Thượng Thiên

2. Second Mistress of Mountain. Vietnamese: Cô Đôi Thượng Ngàn

3. Third Mistress of Water. Vietnamese: Cô Bơ Thoải Cung

4. Fourth Mistress of Earth. Vietnamese: Cô Tư Địa Cung

5. Fifth Mistress of the Lân Stream. Vietnamese: Cô Năm Suối Lân

6. Sixth Mistress of Mountain. Vietnamese: Cô Sáu Sơn Trang

7. Seventh Mistress of Kim Giao. Vietnamese: Cô Bảy Kim Giao

8. Eighth Mistress of Tea Hills. Vietnamese: Cô Tám Đồi Chè

9. Ninth Mistress of Nine Wells. Vietnamese: Cô Chín Cửu Tỉnh

10. Tenth Mistress of Đồng Mỏ. Vietnamese: Cô Mười Đồng Mỏ

11. Little Mistresses of Mountain. Vietnamese: Chư vị Cô Bé Thượng Ngàn

12. Little Mistresses of Water. Vietnamese: Chư vị Cô Bé Thuỷ Cung

== See also ==
- Trưng sisters
- Lady Triệu
- Matriarchy
