= Trấn Quốc Pagoda =

Buddhist temple in Hanoi, Vietnam

Coordinates: 21°02′52″N 105°50′12″E

- Chùa Trấn Quốc
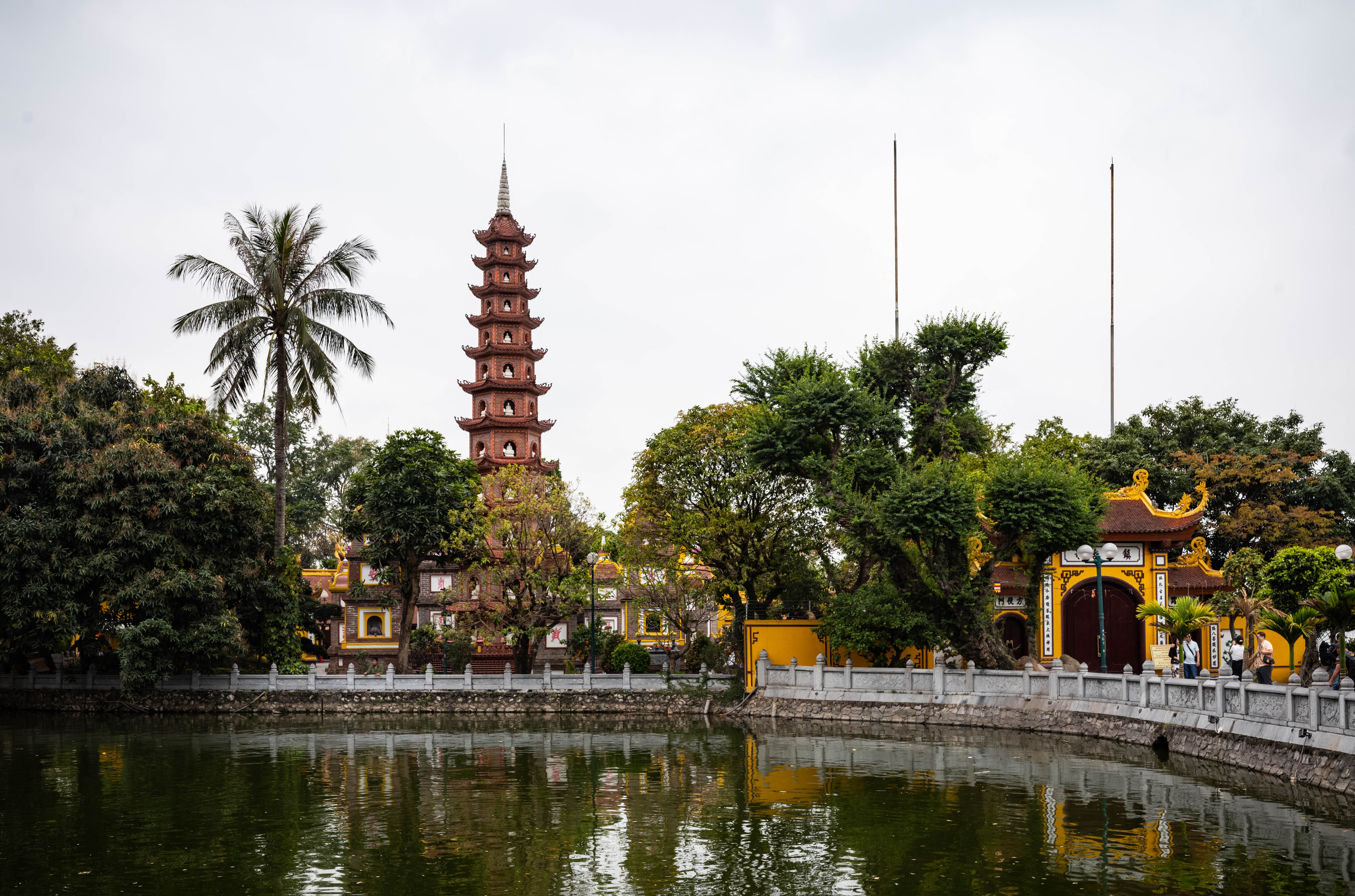
- Pagoda of Trấn Quốc Temple, 2026

Religion
- Affiliation: Buddhism
- District: Tây Hồ
- Province: Hanoi

Location
- Location: West Lake
- Country: Vietnam
- Interactive map of Trấn Quốc Pagoda

Architecture
- Completed: 6th century

Trấn Quốc Pagoda (Vietnamese: chùa Trấn Quốc; Sino-Vietnamese: Trấn Quốc tự, chữ Hán: 鎮國寺), the oldest Buddhist temple in Hanoi, is located on a small island near the southeastern shore of Hanoi's West Lake, Vietnam.

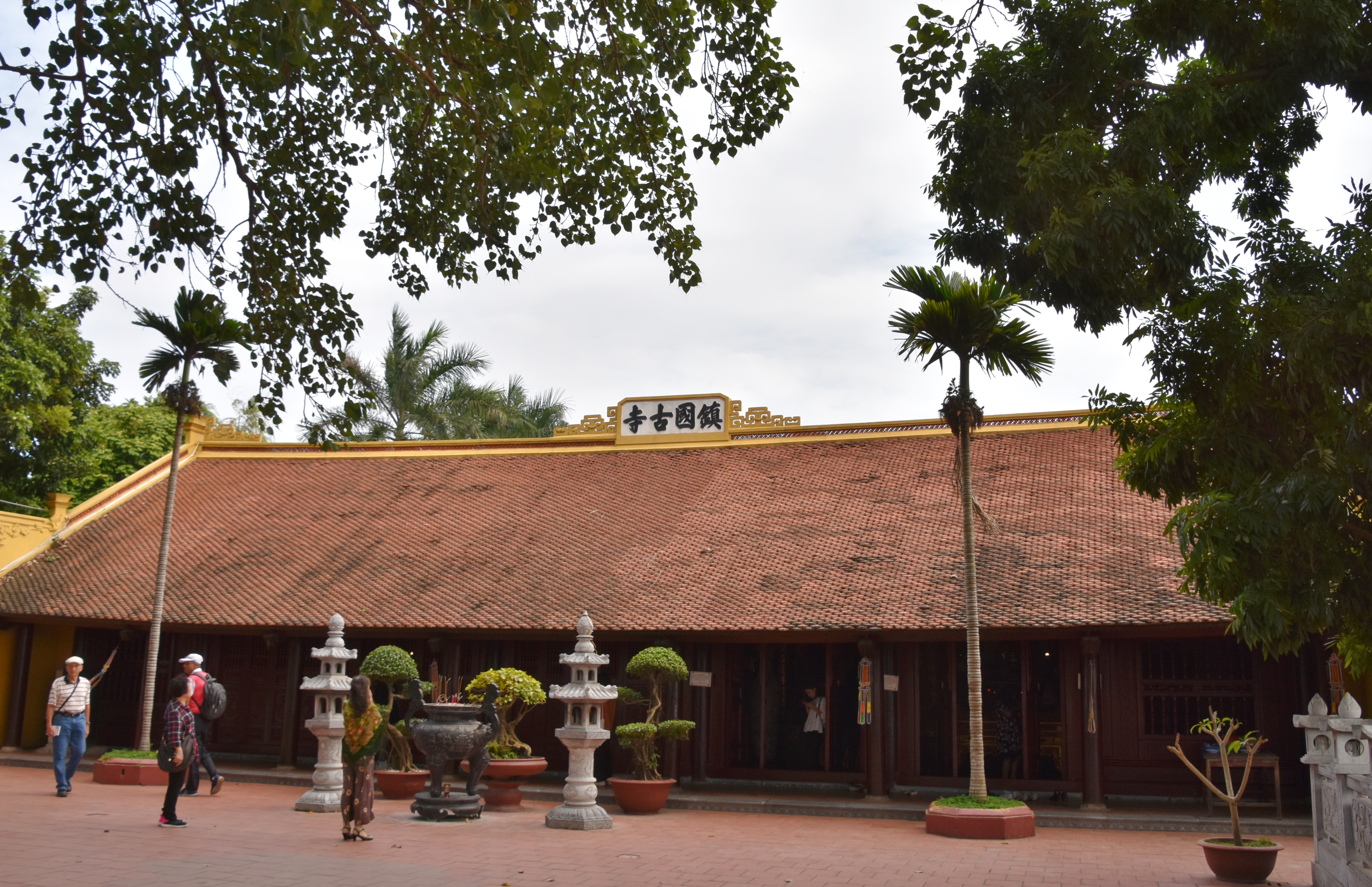
Inside Trấn Quốc Temple

== History ==
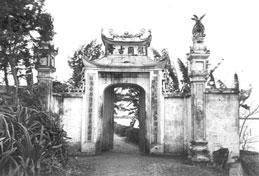
19th century Trấn Quốc Temple gate

The Trấn Quốc Pagoda in Hanoi is the oldest pagoda in the city, originally constructed in the sixth century during the reign of Emperor Lý Nam Đế (from 544 until 548), thus giving it an age of more than 1,500 years. When founded the temple was named Khai Quốc (National Founding) and was sited on the shores of the Red River, outside of the Yên Phụ Dyke. When confronted with the river's encroachment, the temple was relocated in 1615 to Kim Ngư (Golden Fish) islet of Hồ Tây (West Lake) where it is now situated.{{Citation needed}} A small causeway links it to the mainland. The last major repair to the temple was undertaken in 1815 when the main sanctuary, reception hall and posterior hall of the dead were renovated.

The pagoda is one of the main parts of the Trấn Quốc Temple for it holds the important monk's ashes. Most of the pagodas were made in the 17th century.{{Citation needed}}

Monks have lived at the Trấn Quốc Pagoda for centuries, teaching the ways of Buddhism to the public. Before the visitors start arriving, the monks pray at the multiple shrines spread around the grounds. Monks do not get married and therefore do not live with families at the pagoda. Over the years, the temple was variously named An Quốc (Pacification of the Realm) and Trấn Bắc (Guardian of the North) as well.{{Citation needed}}

There is a great deal of Buddhist symbolism at the Trấn Quốc Temple as well. The eight-spoked wheel is the symbol of Buddhism because it represents the Noble Eight-fold Path. At the Trấn Quốc Pagoda, there are many lotus flower statues. These symbolize purity of the mind, body and speech. The lotus flower also symbolizes enlightenment and achievement. The stone wall at the side of the pagoda has multiple carvings of lotus flowers engraved in the stone. The carvings express the beauty of nature in Vietnam.{{Citation needed}}

With its architecture taking advantage of the watery landscape, the pagoda is an attraction. The sunset views from the temple grounds are well known.

Among the historic relics are statuary pieces dating to 1639.{{Citation needed}}

On the grounds of Trấn Quốc is a Bodhi tree taken as cutting of the original tree in Bodh Gaya, India under which the Buddha sat and achieved enlightenment. The gift was made in 1959, marking the visit of the Indian president Rajendra Prasad.{{Citation needed}}

At the main shrine, the visitors are given incense to be burned. Visitors to the shrine also give offerings like food or small amounts of money as a present for the gods to give themselves good luck. Incense is burned to send wishes to the gods and to receive good luck in return. Incense is presented in odd numbers because odd numbers are considered lucky in Chinese and Vietnamese culture. Even numbers such as the number 4 are considered unlucky because the Sino-Vietnamese word for the number four sounds like the word for death in Sino-Vietnamese (tứ-tử). People present offerings without meat because the monks that live in Trấn Quốc are vegetarian.{{Citation needed}}

In the Trấn Quốc Temple they also worship goddesses, known as the "Mẫu" (Mothers). Their shrines are in the front of the courtyard. The Mẫu Thượng Ngàn (green Mother) has domain over the mountains and forests. The Mẫu Thoải (white Mother) has domain over the water. And lastly the Mẫu Thượng Thiên (red Mother) has domain over the sky. These are some of the oldest gods or goddesses that have been worshiped in Vietnam and were in Vietnam before the Buddha.

The worshipers who come inside the temple to pray can come anytime they want. However, it is especially popular during the 1st month of the Vietnamese calendar. They pray in many small and large shrines all around the temple.{{Citation needed}}

== See also ==
- List of Buddhist temples in Hanoi
