= Liễu Hạnh =

Goddess in Vietnamese mythology

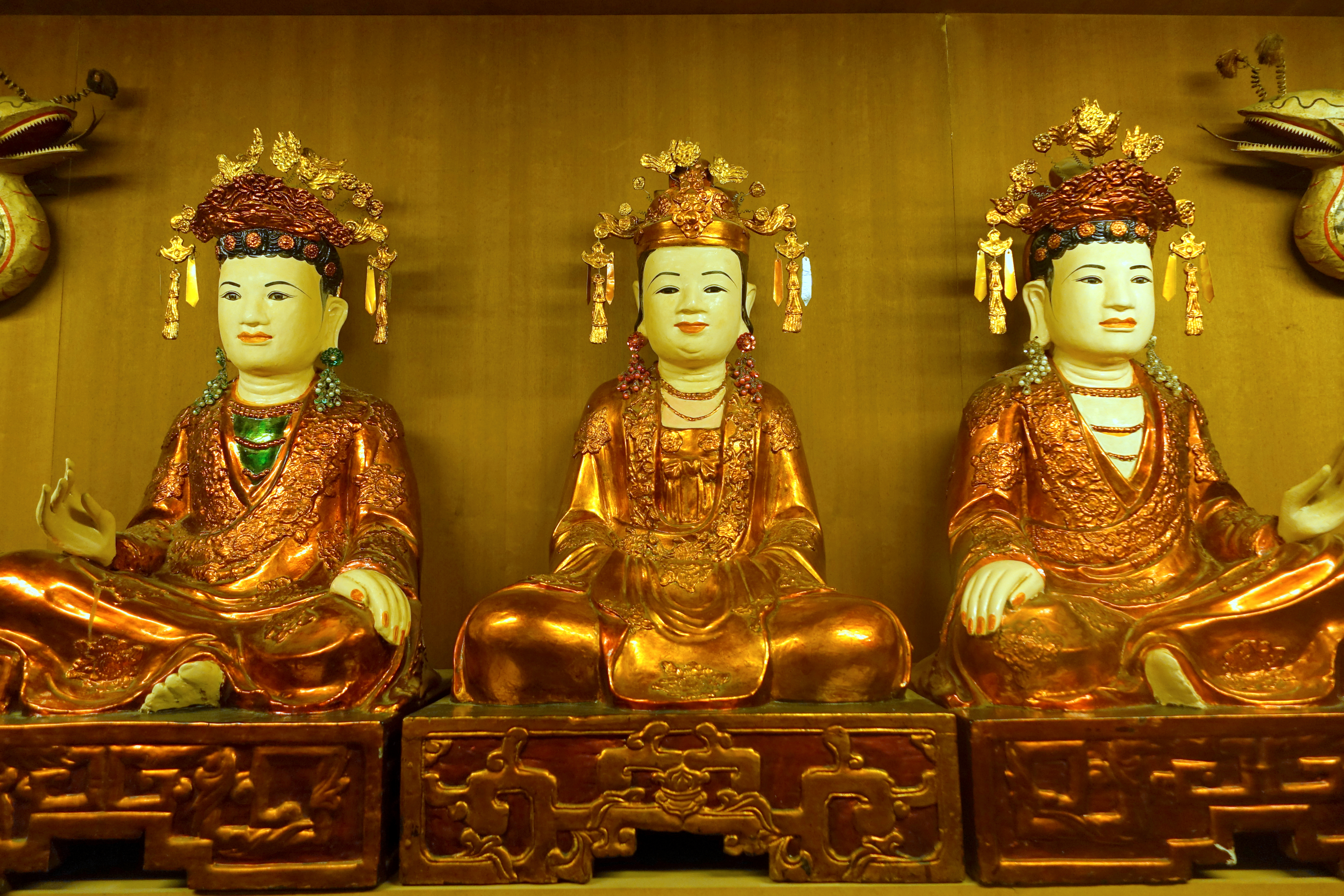
Statue of Mẫu Liễu Hạnh (the goddess in the middle) and two goddesses, Mẫu Thượng Ngàn and Mẫu Thoải

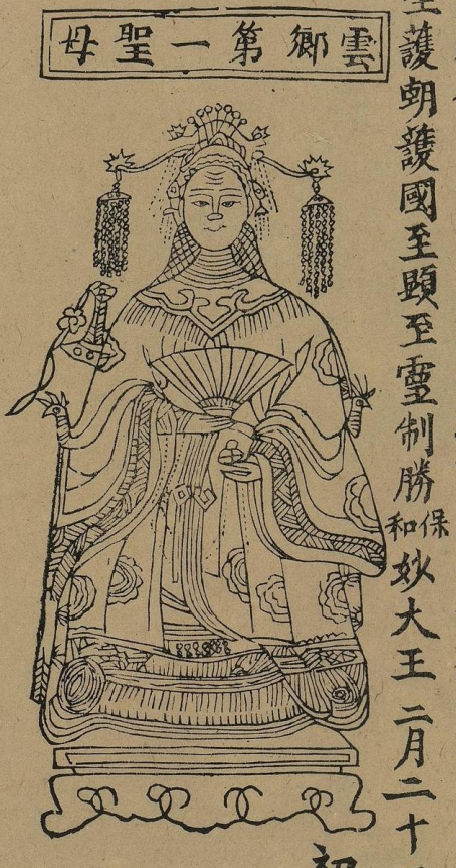
Vân Hương Đệ Nhất Thánh Mẫu 雲鄉第一聖母 depicted in Mechanics and Crafts of the People of Annam. Also known as Princess Liễu Hạnh (Liễu Hạnh Công chúa, 柳杏公主)

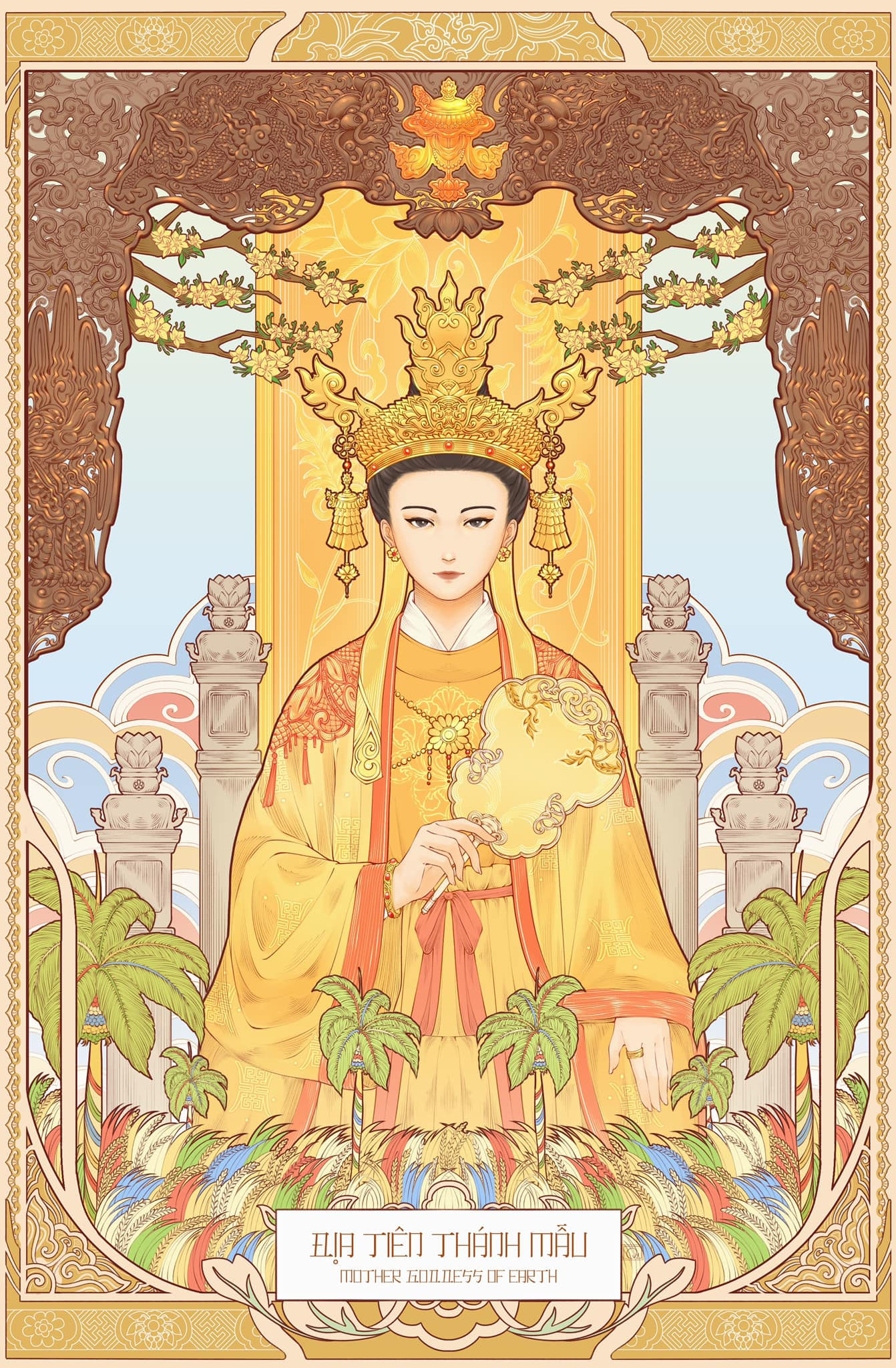
Painting of Mother Goddess Liễu Hạnh, who is titled as the Second Mother Goddess of Earth in the Four Palaces denomination, Mother Goddess religion. This painting is from the project Divine Portraits by Four Palaces - Tứ Phủ.

Princess Liễu Hạnh (Vietnamese: Liễu Hạnh Công chúa, chữ Hán: 柳杏公主) is one of The Four Immortals in Vietnamese folk religion, and also a leading figure in the Four Palaces belief of the Đạo Mẫu, in which she governs the Earth realm and represents the Heaven realm on behalf of Mẫu Cửu Trùng Thiên.

Her personal cult was created by women in Nam Định Province, in the village of Van Cat. It is believed that the cult was created by rice farmers in need of land and water, and at its peak was extremely popular. The cult was mostly suppressed during the Communist Party of Vietnam's early reign, as worship was considered to be Taoist in nature, and was a tool of oppression. However, after Doi Moi (begun 1986) the cult has been regaining popularity steadily.

== Traditions ==
The most widespread knowledge of her is because of Đoàn Thị Điểm Vân Cát Thần Nữ truyện (c.1730).

=== In Vân Cát Thần Nữ truyện (Story of the Vân Cát goddess) ===
Born as the daughter of Ngọc Hoàng, Quỳnh Nương had always been the troublemaker of the family. A righteous man, Lê Thái Công, was knocked unconscious during his wife (Trần Thị Phúc)'s pregnancy by a Taoist with his jade hammer. While unconscious, Thái Công arrived at the Heavenly Palace of the Ngọc Hoàng and witnessed Quỳnh Nương drop the jade cup, for which the Ngọc Hoàng expelled Quỳnh Nương from heaven. When Thái Công regained consciousness his wife had given birth to a girl, whom they named Lê Thị Thắng, Art name "Giáng Tiên"(Descending Fairy). After living a righteous life of 23 years, marrying Trần Đào (because he was found under a peach (Đào) tree and adopted by Trần family) - whom she was betrothed by her family, and giving birth to two children, Nhân for the son and Hòa for the daughter, Giáng Tiên died on the third day of the third month.

When Giáng Tiên died she ascended to Heaven and was granted the title of Princess Liễu Hạnh, and was permitted to return to earth on the second anniversary of her death. On her return she visited her family and told her husband that they would reunite again, and disappeared leaving nothing behind but clouds in the sky. She wandered the world as either an old woman or a beautiful lady playing the flute, punishing those who teased her and blessing those who gave her offerings.

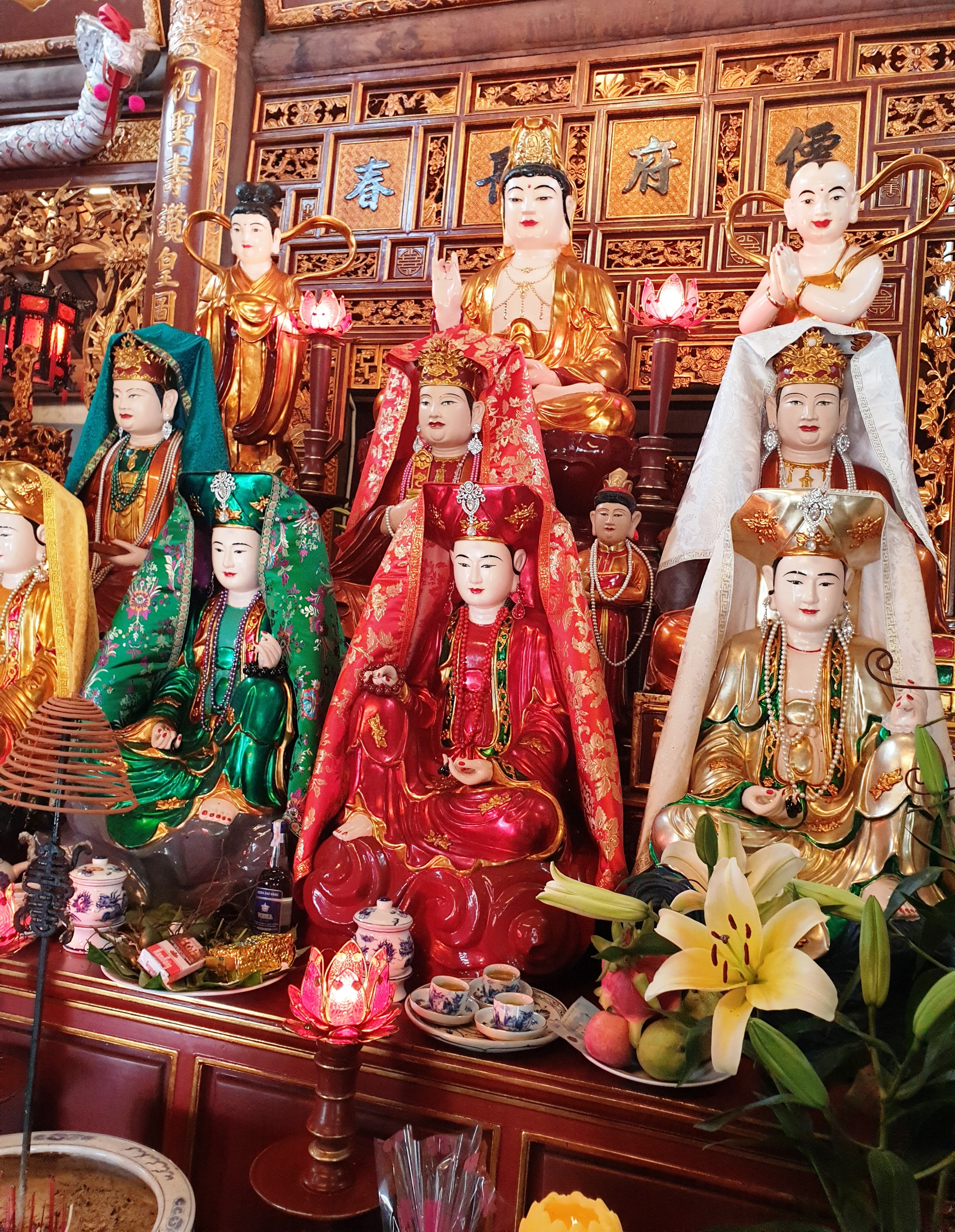
Statue of Mẫu Liễu Hạnh, the goddess wearing a red dress in the middle, second row from the top

Long after her family died, she visited a temple and met Phùng Khắc Khoan, a famous scholar, who attempted to compliment the princess. However, she had disappeared before he had the chance, leaving a stick inscribed with her name. Years later Phùng, who was now a high-ranking official, visited a tavern in West Lake which was owned by Liễu Hạnh. After poetry and discussion, Phùng left the tavern, but when he returned it had mysteriously disappeared.

Leaving West Lake, the princess reincarnated to the Hoàng family in Nghệ An, where she met a student named Mai Thanh Lâm, also called Mai Sinh ("Sinh" means "student"), whom she thought to be an incarnation of her husband. After leaving poetry for him, Sinh sought her out and confessed his love to her. They married and had a son named Mai Thanh Cổn (later worshipped as Cậu bé Đồi Ngang in Đạo Mẫu), Sinh becoming a great scholar. Eventually it was time for Liễu Hạnh to return to Heaven, and she sadly left her family to return to Heaven.

On her second return to Heaven the princess again pleaded with the emperor to return to earth, and this time returned with two other fairies—Quế and Thị. The princess blessed those who were good, and brought destruction on those who were not, so the people built a temple out of fear. The Cảnh Trị government heard she was an evil spirit and sent the military to burn down the temple. When her temple was burnt down, all the animals in the area died from a mysterious disease, so the villagers built a platform to send her offerings. The princess appeared on the platform, declaring she was from Heaven, and demanded that the government build a new temple for her to stop the epidemic. The government built the new temple in Phố Cát Mountain, and proclaimed her "Mã Hoàng Công Chúa" (Golden Princess to Whom Sacrifices Are Made as to the God of War).

=== In Trang Quynh's folk tales ===
Princess Lieu Hanh was referenced in several Trang Quynh folk tales where her status as a deity was subjected to witty tricks by Quynh.

Popular tales:

- Borrowing Money from Goddess Lieu (Vietnamese: Trả Ơn Bà Chúa Liễu)

- Repaying Lady Lieu's Favor (Vietnamese: Vay Tiền Chúa Liễu)

- Goddess Lieu Gets Tricked (Vietnamese: Chúa Liễu Mắc Lỡm)

- Thanking Goddess Lieu with Three Cows (Vietnamese: Tạ Chúa Liễu Ba Bò)

== Temples ==
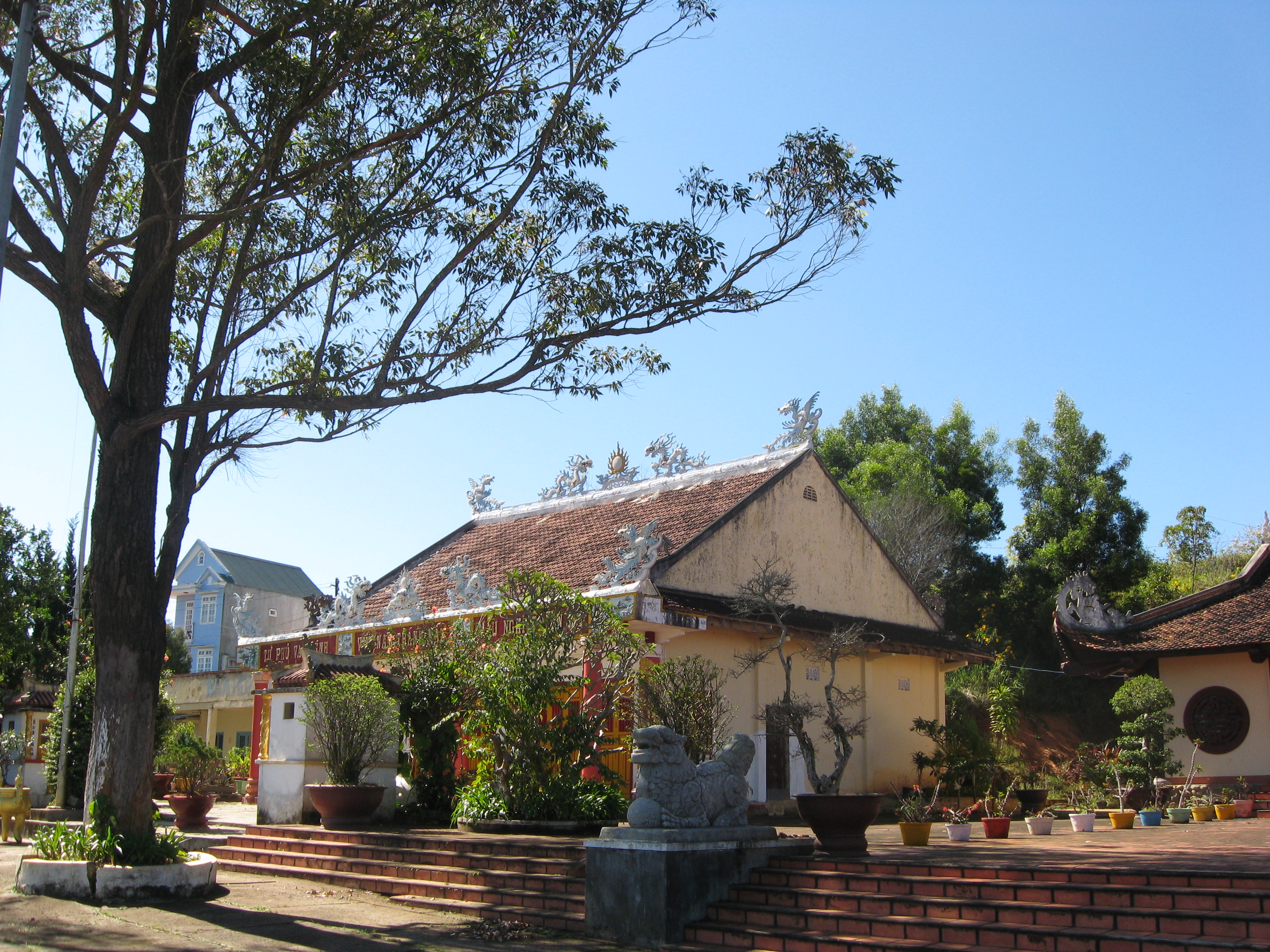
Thánh Mẫu Temple in Dalat

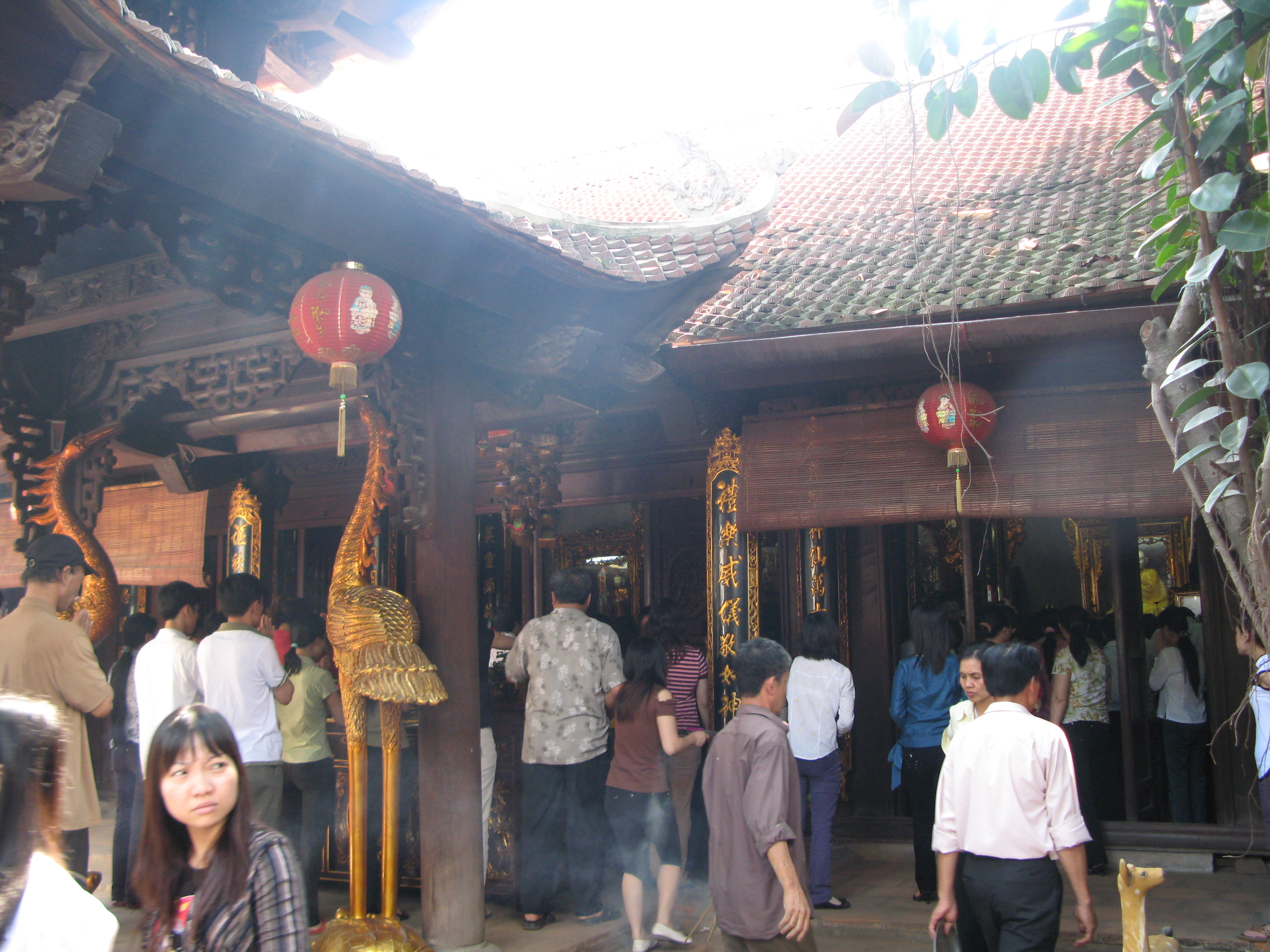
Altar for the mother goddess Liễu Hạnh behind Hà Temple (Chùa Hà), Hà Nội

Đạo Mẫu practitioners maintain both public and private temples, engaging in worship and spirit possession. The first temple devoted to Lieu Hanh has traditionally been considered Phu Van temple in Van Cat which was originally constructed in 1642. The next to appear was the Tien Huong temple sometime between 1643 and 1649, which would come to be the main center for Lieu Hanh's cult. Temples to Lieu Hanh are known to have many wooden sculptures, and the temples themselves have intricate designs carved into the framework.

== Historical existence ==
Whether or not Liễu Hạnh was a historical person is a subject of debate, as accounts for her life are difficult to match to a proper timeline. The earliest written account for her existence was in the 1880s by A. Landes, a French colonialist. He places her appearance at sometime between 1428 and 1433. However, the vast majority of stories claim her birth to be the year 1557, including Đoàn Thị Điểm. In 1750 Adriano di St. Thecla, an Italian missionary both commented on the popularity of the cult, and that Liễu Hạnh had indeed been a historical person.
