= Savage (nightclub) =

Vietnamese nightclub

Savage was a nightclub in Hanoi, Vietnam.

The club was located in the former Angolan embassy in Hanoi.

In 2020 the club was described by Mixmag as 'the epicentre of an underground awakening in Hanoi'.

== History ==
The club was launched in 2016, and in 2020 relocated to the Tay Ho district of Hanoi, in the former Angolan embassy building. In 2025, it was announced that the club would be closing due to a proposed government development in the area.

The club was established by French expats Samy, Ouissam and Julie. They had previously been label managers and promoters in Hong Kong, before being motivated to relocate to Vietnam for economic reasons. It is associated with the Vietnamese underground electronic music scene, and queer clubbing scene.

== Description ==
The Angolan embassy venue is described as a three-story building with a garden. it has two club rooms, the Anteroom and Red Cube, as well as a coffee shop and record store named Pond Records, which doubles up as an online radio station.

In 2025 the venue was criticised in a state-media publication for allowing the sale of laughing gas at its venue, in violation of the law.

== Notable acts ==
Notable acts at the venue include the resident DJ Di Linh.
