= Mẫu Thượng Thiên =

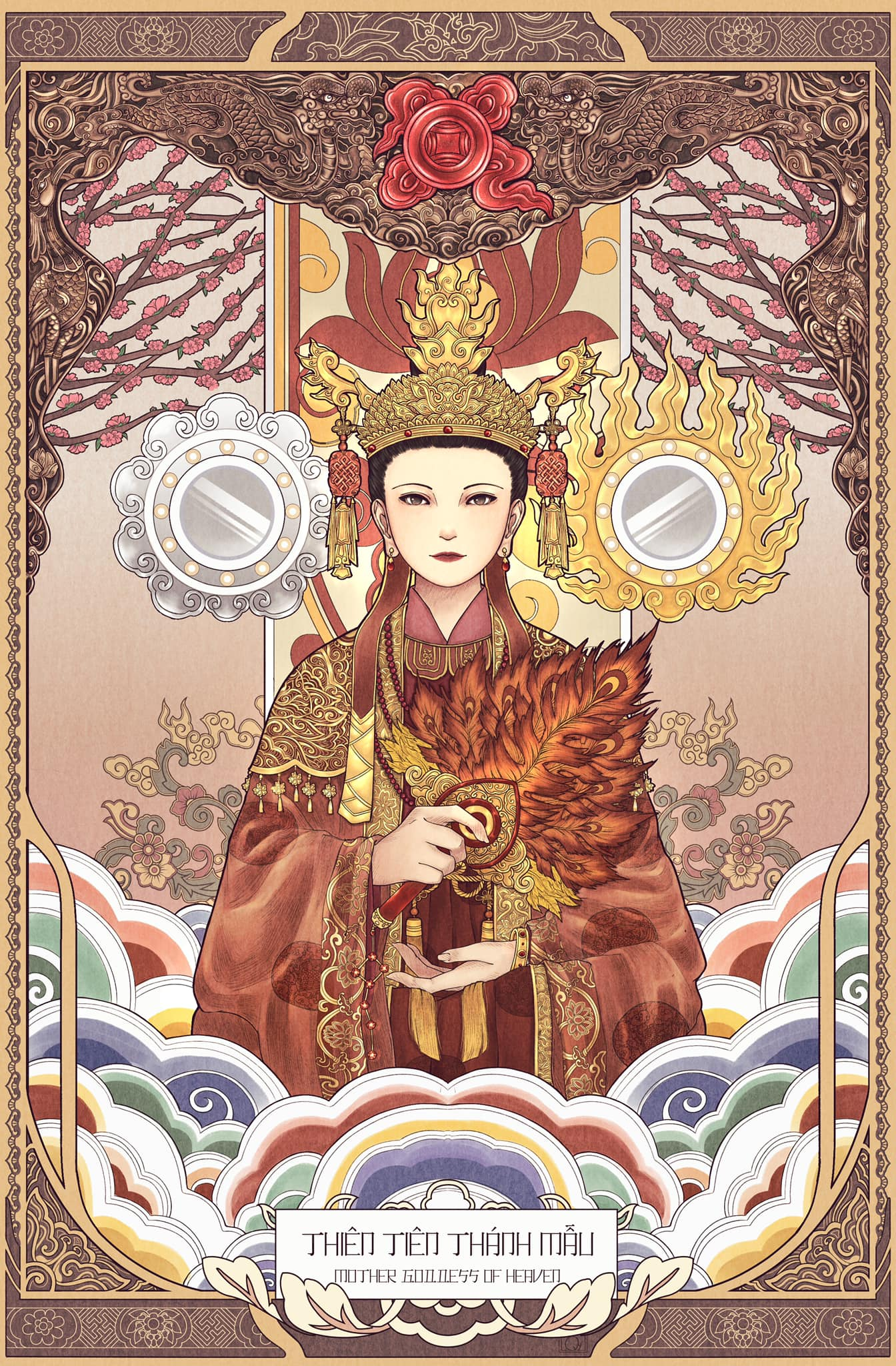
Painting of Mẫu Thượng Thiên in Lê dynasty costume belonging to the Thánh Nhan project

Mẫu Thượng Thiên (Chữ Hán: 母上天) or Mẫu Đệ Nhất (母第一) is one of the four heavenly mothers in the Four Palaces in Vietnamese folk religion. She is one of the spirits invoked in the form of lên đồng mediumship particularly associated with Đạo Mẫu worship.

The following characters are often considered as the Mẫu Thượng Thiên or the Mẫu Đệ Nhất:

- Thanh Vân Princess (Mẫu Cửu Trùng Thiên)
- Tây Thiên Quốc Mẫu Lăng Thị Tiêu (Mẫu Tây Thiên, Chúa Tây Thiên)
- Liễu Hạnh Princess (Mẫu Liễu Hạnh, Bà Chúa Liễu)
- Mẫu Thiên Y A Na (Thiên Hậu Thánh Mẫu, Bà Chúa Ngọc)
