= Tây Hồ district =

Coordinates: 21.0707°N 105.8120°E

Tây Hồ district Quận Tây Hồ
- Urban district
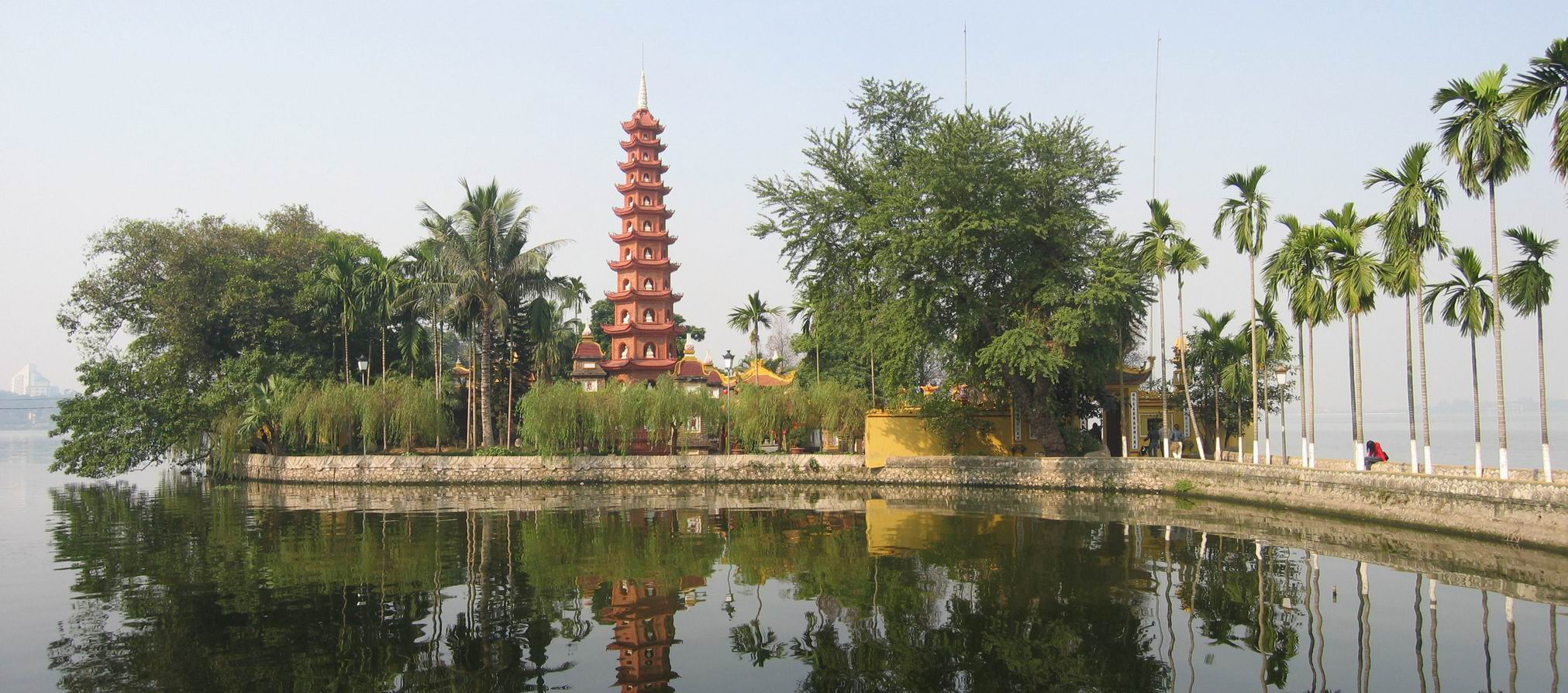
- Trấn Quốc Pagoda adjacent to the West Lake
- Interactive map of Tây Hồ district
- Country: Vietnam
- Central city: Hanoi
- Seat: 657 Lạc Long Quân, Xuân La ward
- Wards: 8

Government
  - People's Committee: Nguyễn Anh Tuấn
  - People's Council: Đỗ Anh Tuấn

Area
  - Total: 24.39 km^{2} (9.42 sq mi)

Population (2019)
  - Total: 160,495
  - Density: 6,580/km^{2} (17,040/sq mi)
- Time zone: UTC+7 (ICT)
- Area code: 24
- Climate: Cwa

Tây Hồ (West Lake) is an urban district (quận) located on the north side of central Hanoi, the capital city of Vietnam. The district wraps around the West Lake (hồ Tây), one of the largest natural lakes of Vietnam. The district currently has 8 wards, covering a total area of 24.39 square kilometres (9.42 sq mi). As of 2019, there were 160,495 people residing in the district, the population density is 6,600 inhabitants per square kilometer.

Tây Hồ is a high-end residential area, housing a large population of expatriates and many Western restaurants and boutiques. Tây Hồ is popular with expats because of its infrastructure, schools, hospitals, and restaurants.

== History ==
Following decree 69/CE set fourth by the Socialist Republic of Vietnam government, Tây Hồ was officially recognized as a district on October 28, 1995. The district was, and is, still considered to be a center of entertainment, tourism, and natural conservation of Hanoi.

Since 1996, Tây Hồ has been home to the Quảng Bá flower market (chợ Hoa đêm Quảng Bá), one of the largest night flower markets in Vietnam and a popular tourist destination.

== Geography ==
Tây Hồ is bordered by four districts: Long Biên district (to the east), Bắc Từ Liêm district (to the west), Ba Đình district (to the south), and Đông Anh district (to the north).

== Administrative division ==
Tây Hồ is divided into 8 wards: Bưởi, Nhật Tân, Phú Thượng, Quảng An, Thuỵ Khuê, Tứ Liên, Xuân La and Yên Phụ.

== Streets ==
The three main avenues in the district, Lạc Long Quân, Âu Cơ, and An Dương Vương, were names of leaders of early Vietnamese civilization. The smaller streets in the district are named after renowned Vietnamese poets, artists and music composers, such as Xuân Diệu, Tô Ngọc Vân, Trịnh Công Sơn, Nguyễn Đình Thi and Đặng Thai Mai.

== Education ==
Tây Hồ currently has two international schools, Singapore International School (SIS) @ Ciputra and United Nations International School of Hanoi. Chu Văn An National School is also a notable school in this district.
