= Bà Chúa Kho =

Bà Chúa Kho Temple
- Đền Bà Chúa Kho
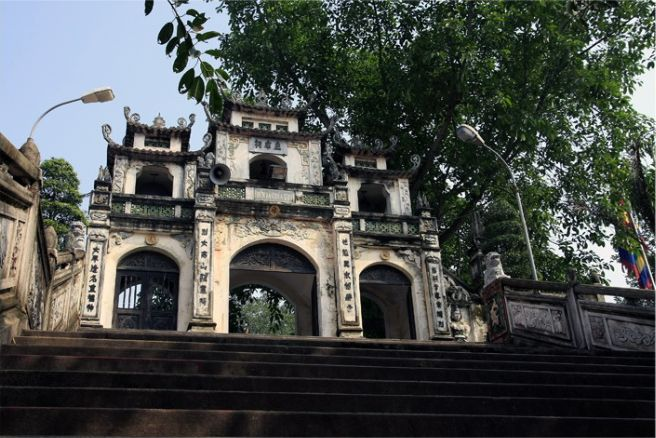

Religion
- Affiliation: Folk religion

Location
- Location: Cổ Mễ, Vũ Ninh ward, Bắc Ninh province, Vietnam
- Interactive map of Bà Chúa Kho Temple
- Coordinates: 21°12′23″N 106°05′02″E

Architecture
- Type: Temple
- Style: Vietnamese
- Completed: Lý dynasty (11th century)

Bà Chúa Kho Temple (Vietnamese: Đền Bà Chúa Kho) is a historic temple located on the slopes of Núi Kho in Cổ Mễ village, Vũ Ninh ward, Bắc Ninh province, Vietnam. Dedicated to Bà Chúa Kho, a Vietnamese folk goddess associated with wealth, prosperity, and grain storage, the temple dates back to the Lý dynasty and is part of the Cổ Mễ historical complex, which includes a communal house (đình) and a pagoda (chùa). It is a popular pilgrimage site where devotees pray for business success and financial blessings, often engaging in the ritual of "borrowing" symbolic money from the goddess. The temple has been recognized as a national historical site by the Vietnamese government.

== Architecture ==
The temple is arranged along the mountain slope, featuring a tam quan gate, courtyard (sân đền), side wings (hai dải vũ), front hall (tiền tế), and rear sanctuary (hậu cung). It forms a unified architectural ensemble with intricate wood carvings. The complex includes Đình Cổ Mễ, built in the "nhất" style with five bays and detailed carvings of dragons, clouds, and tigers, and Chùa Cổ Mễ, originating from the Lý dynasty with stone statues from the Mạc period and a 19th-century T-shaped structure. A notable feature is a vaulted tunnel behind the temple, believed to have been built by Bà Chúa Kho as a secret passage or military outpost, leading to the Cầu River. In front of the temple is a large pond surrounded by mountains.
