= West Lake (Hanoi) =

- Hồ Tây (Vietnamese)
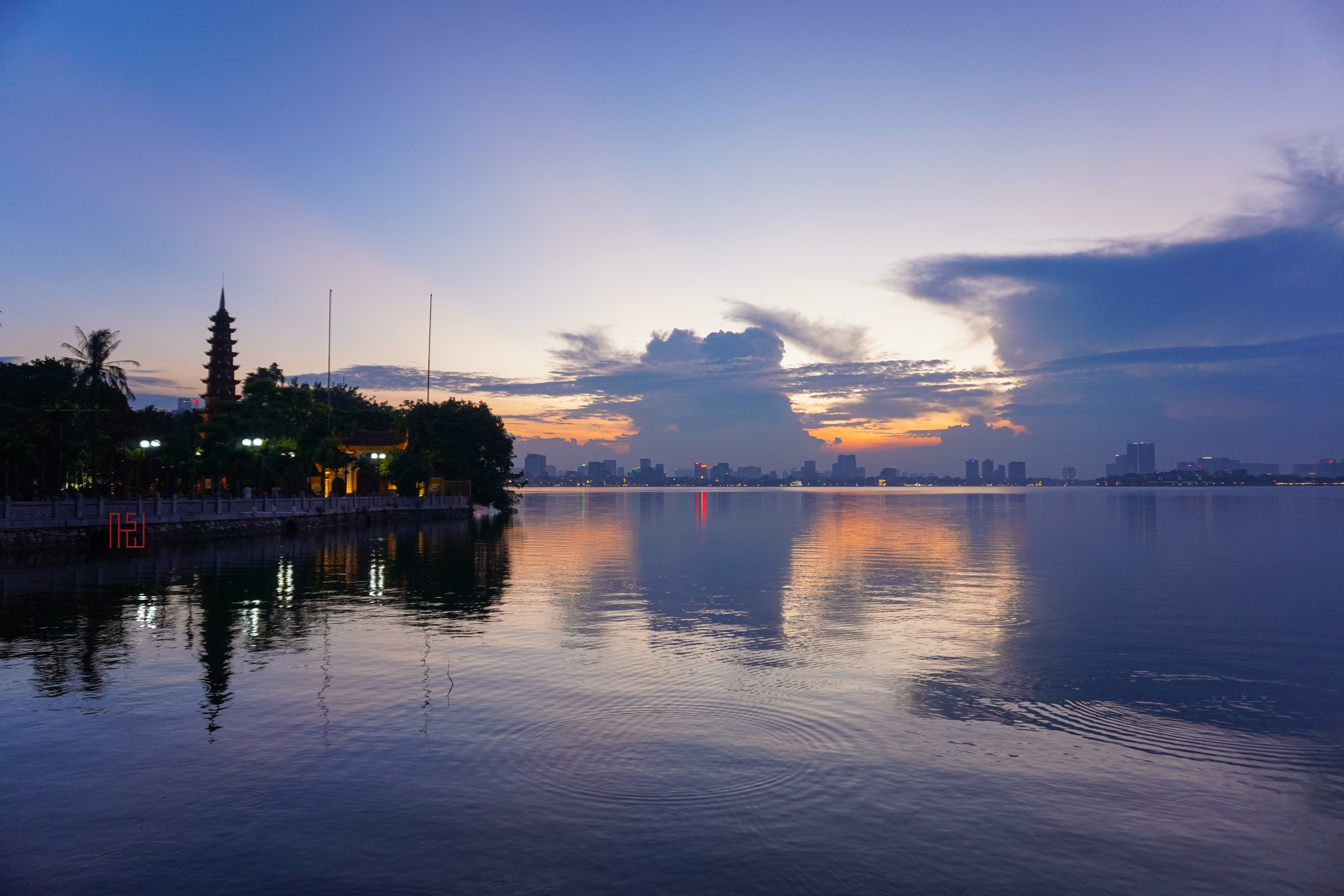
- West Lake at sunset

- Location within Vietnam
- Location: Hanoi
- Coordinates: 21°3′18″N 105°49′12″E
- Lake type: Freshwater lake
- Basin countries: Vietnam
- Surface area: 5.26 km^{2} (2.03 sq mi)
- Shore length^{1}: 17 km (11 mi)
- ^{1} Shore length is not a well-defined measure.

West Lake (Vietnamese: Hồ Tây) is the biggest freshwater lake of Hanoi, Vietnam, located northwest of the city center. With a shore length of 17 kilometres (11 mi) and 500 hectares (5.0 km^{2}) in area, this is the largest lake of the capital and a popular place for recreation with many surrounding gardens, hotels and villas. A small part of West Lake is divided by Thanh Niên road to form Trúc Bạch Lake. Most of the lake is located within Tây Hồ District, named after the lake.

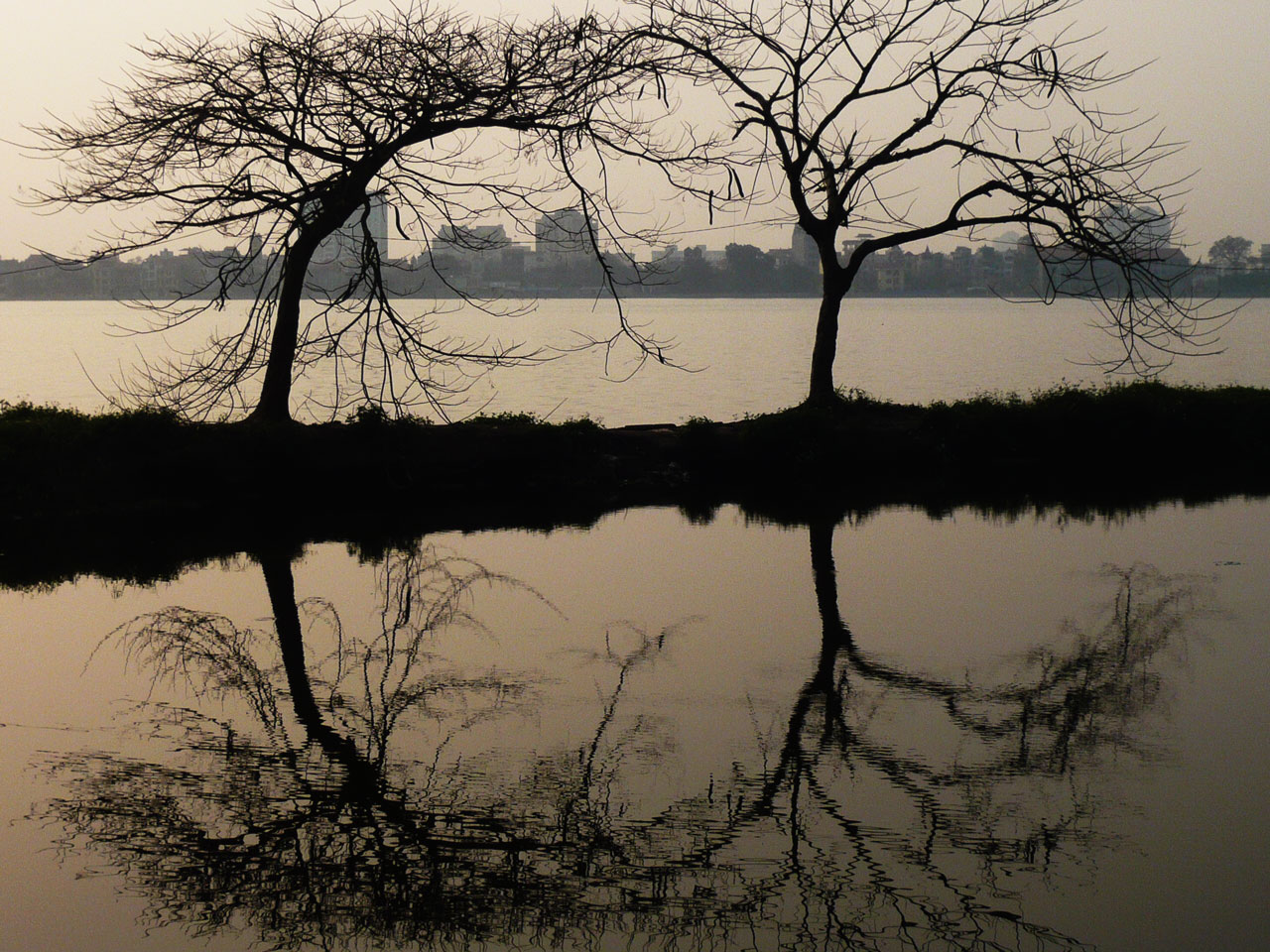
West Lake when the sun is about to set

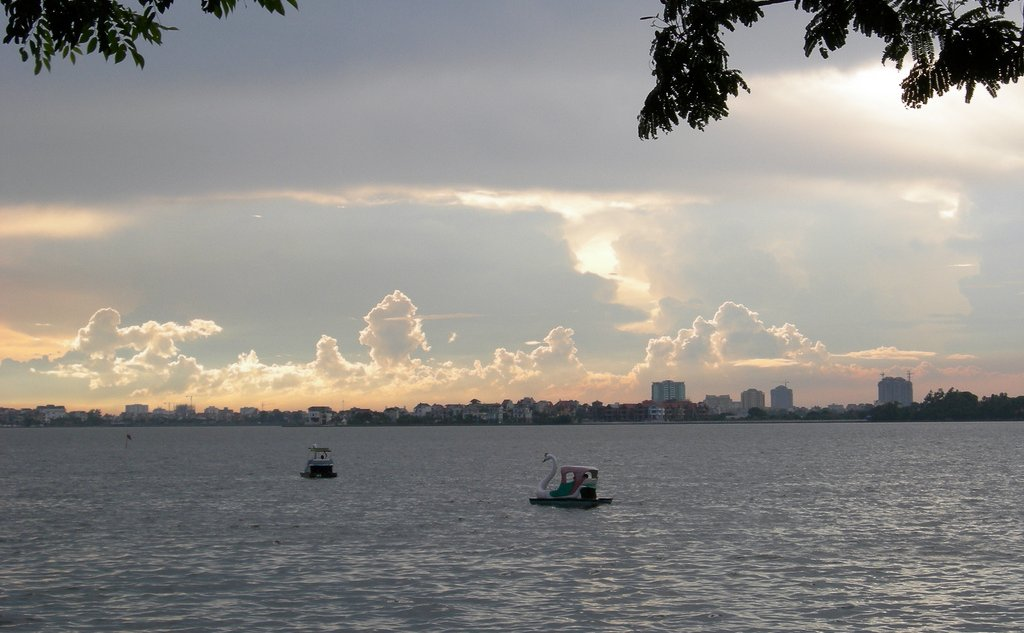
West Lake at dusk

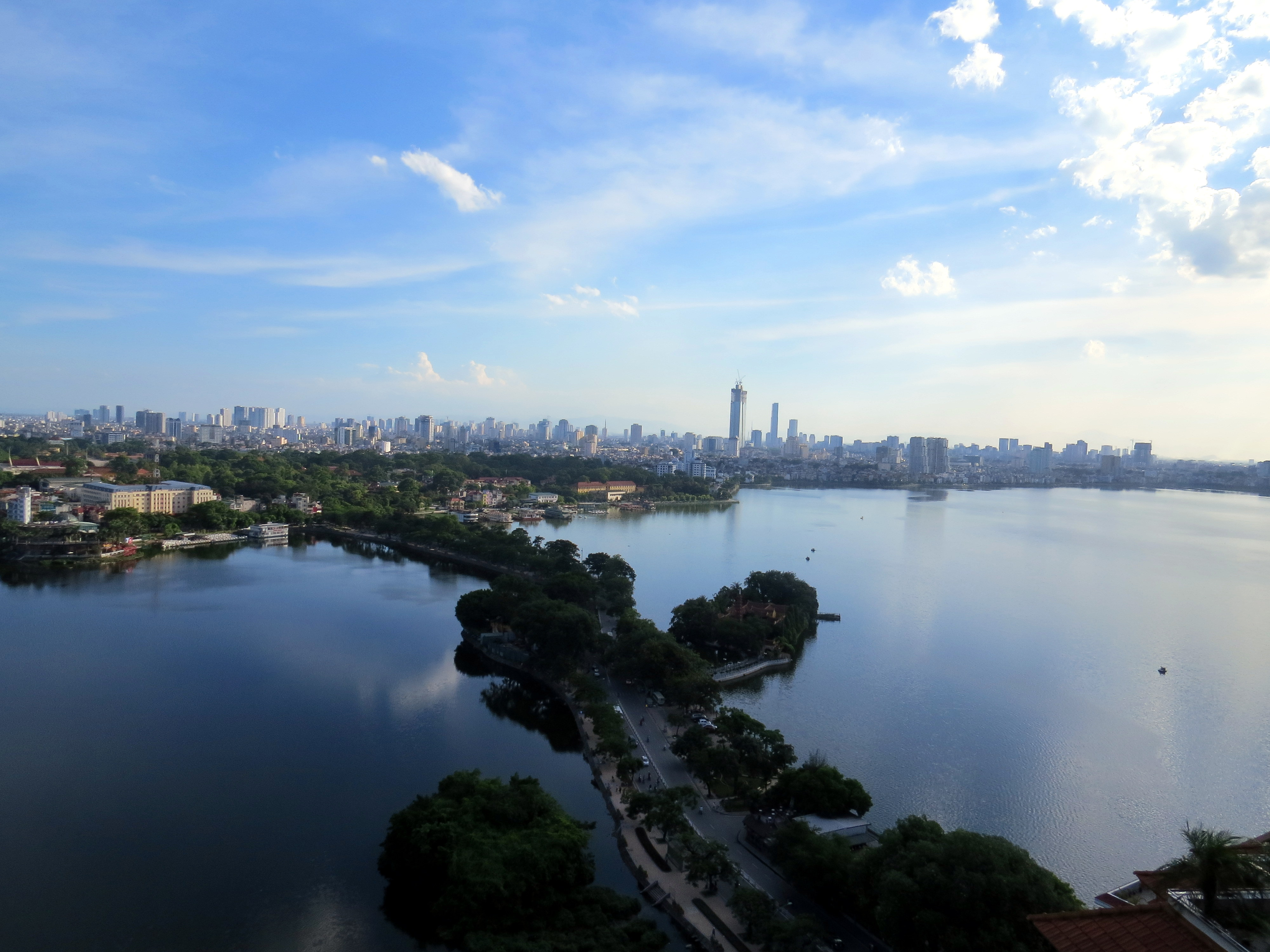
The border between Trúc Bạch Lake and West Lake

== History ==
West Lake was created from a curved part of Red River and appeared in several Vietnamese legends. One legend suggests that West Lake was shaped after the battle between Lạc Long Quân and a hồ tinh (nine-tailed fox), and that's why the lake was once called "Fox Corpse Swamp" (Đầm Xác Cáo). Another folk story claimed that original name of the lake was "Golden Buffalo Lake" (Hồ Trâu Vàng, or Sino-Vietnamese vocabulary: Hồ Kim Ngưu) because it was formed from struggle of a buffalo after the disappearance of her calf. In the 11th century, the lake was named "Foggy Lake" (chữ Hán: 霪潭; Vietnamese: Hồ Dâm Đàm) due to its misty condition. Ultimately its name was changed to "West Lake" in 1573 to avoid the given name of Emperor Lê Thế Tông, which was Duy Đàm.

West Lake is bordered by many significant places in the history of Hanoi and Vietnam. Trấn Quốc Pagoda, an ancient Buddhist temple in Vietnam, was built in the 6th century by Emperor Lý Nam Đế and is located on a small island in the middle of the lake. Near Trấn Quốc Pagoda is Quán Thánh Temple, one of the Four Sacred Temples of ancient Hanoi (Vietnamese: Thăng Long Tứ Trấn). Chu Văn An High School, one of the oldest high schools in Vietnam, is also located close to the lake.

== Recreation activities ==
As Hanoi's largest lake, located right in the center of Hanoi, West Lake is abundant with gardens, hotels, restaurants and other entertainment centers. For this reason, real estate prices near West Lake are staggering, and the surrounding quarters are often full of many imposingly large edifices occupied by wealthy Vietnamese people and expatriates.
