= Four Palaces =

The Four Palaces (Tứ Phủ) are where “spirits of the Four Palaces” (thánh Tứ Phủ) reside in Vietnamese indigenous religion. The colour of the clothes of mediums reflects the token colour of each of the four spirits of which they are possessed. Trần Triều (lit. 'Trần Dynasty'), the spirit of Saint Trần altars associated with Trần Hưng Đạo, Supreme Commander of Đại Việt during the Trần Dynasty, is distinguished from the spirits of the four palaces. The chair of the four spirits is found in many temples in Vietnam.

The four palaces are:

- Thiên phủ (Heavens Palace) ruled by mẫu Thượng Thiên (goddess of the upper sky)
- Nhạc phủ (Forest Palace) ruled by mẫu Thượng Ngàn (goddess of the highlands), also known as Lâm Cung Thánh Mẫu (林宮聖母)
- Thuỷ phủ (Water Palace) ruled by mẫu Thoải (Mother Water), also known as Thủy cung Thánh Mẫu (水宮聖母).
- Địa phủ (Earth Palace) ruled by mẫu Địa Phủ, also known as Lục cung thánh mẫu
