= Âu Cơ =

Goddess of Vietnamese creation myth

Âu Cơ 嫗姬
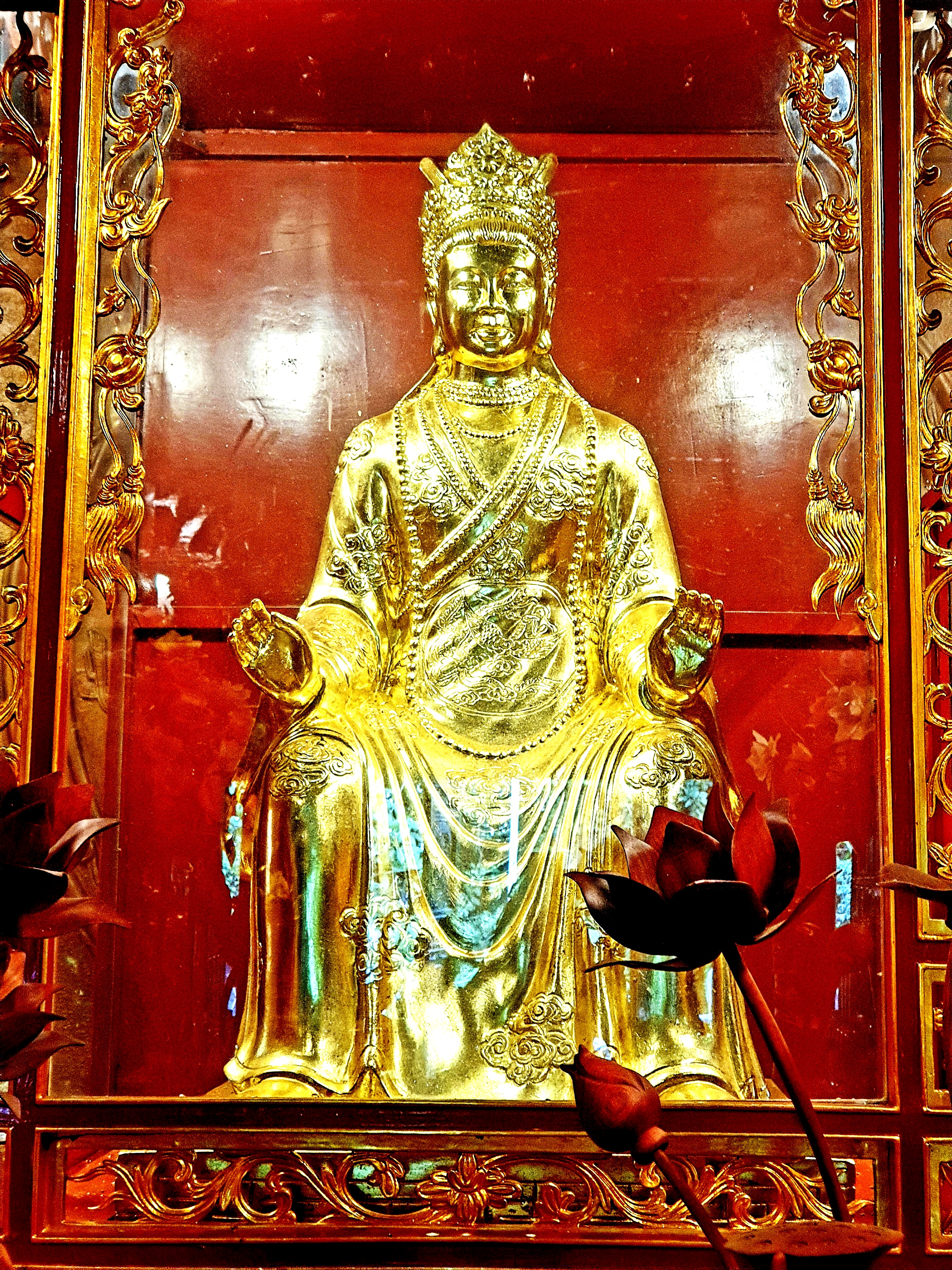
- Âu Cơ statue at Hộ Quốc Temple
- Born: 2825 BC
- Died: 2520 BC

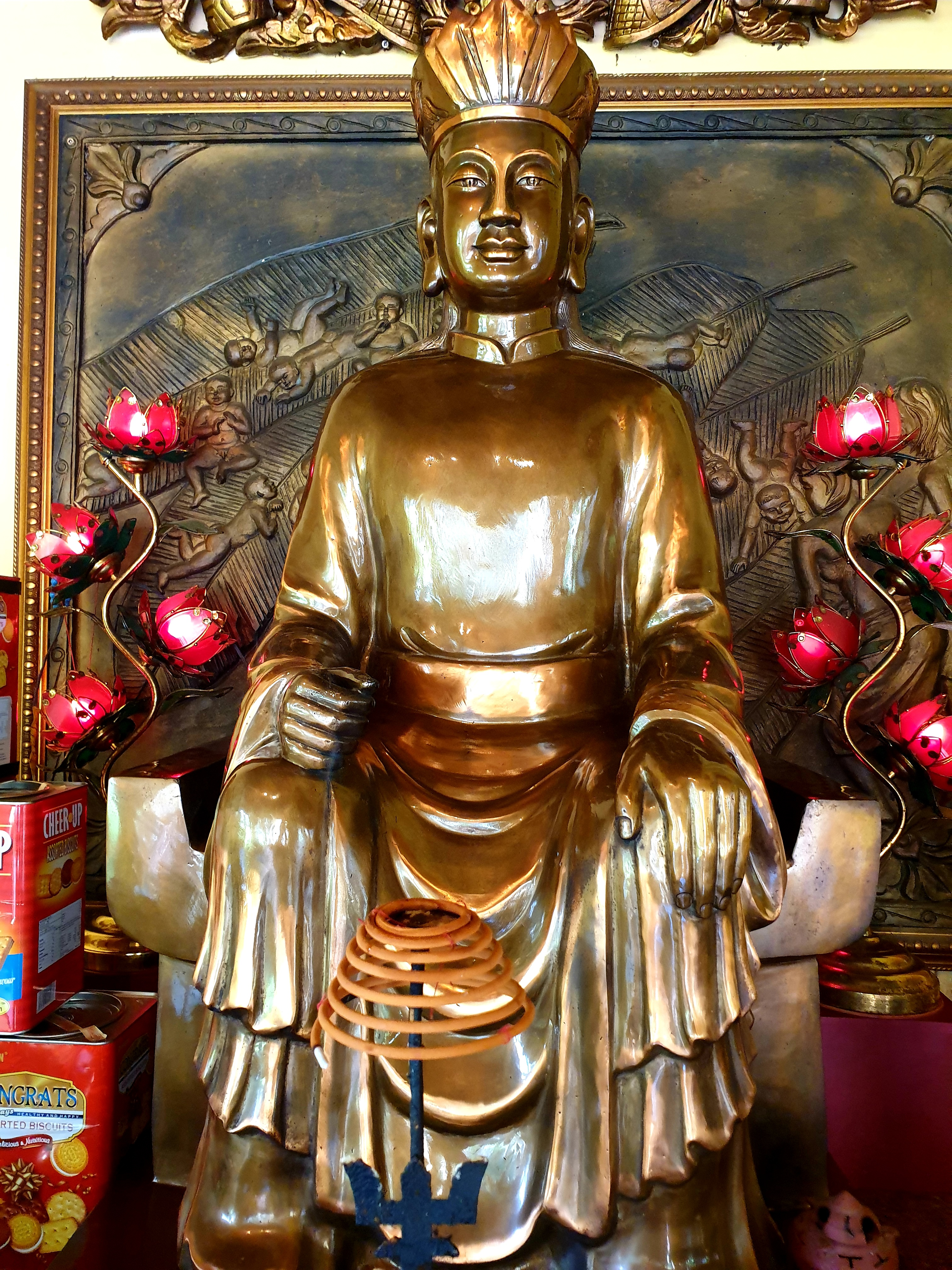
Âu Cơ statue at Hùng Temple, Tao Đàn, Hồ Chí Minh City

Âu Cơ (chữ Hán: 甌姬; IPA: [ʔəu˧ kəː˧]) was, according to the creation myth of the Vietnamese people, an immortal mountain snow goddess who married Lạc Long Quân (lit. 'Dragon Lord of Lạc'), and bore an egg sac that hatched a hundred children known collectively as Bách Việt, ancestors to the Vietnamese people. Âu Cơ is often honored as the mother of Vietnamese civilization.

== Mythology ==
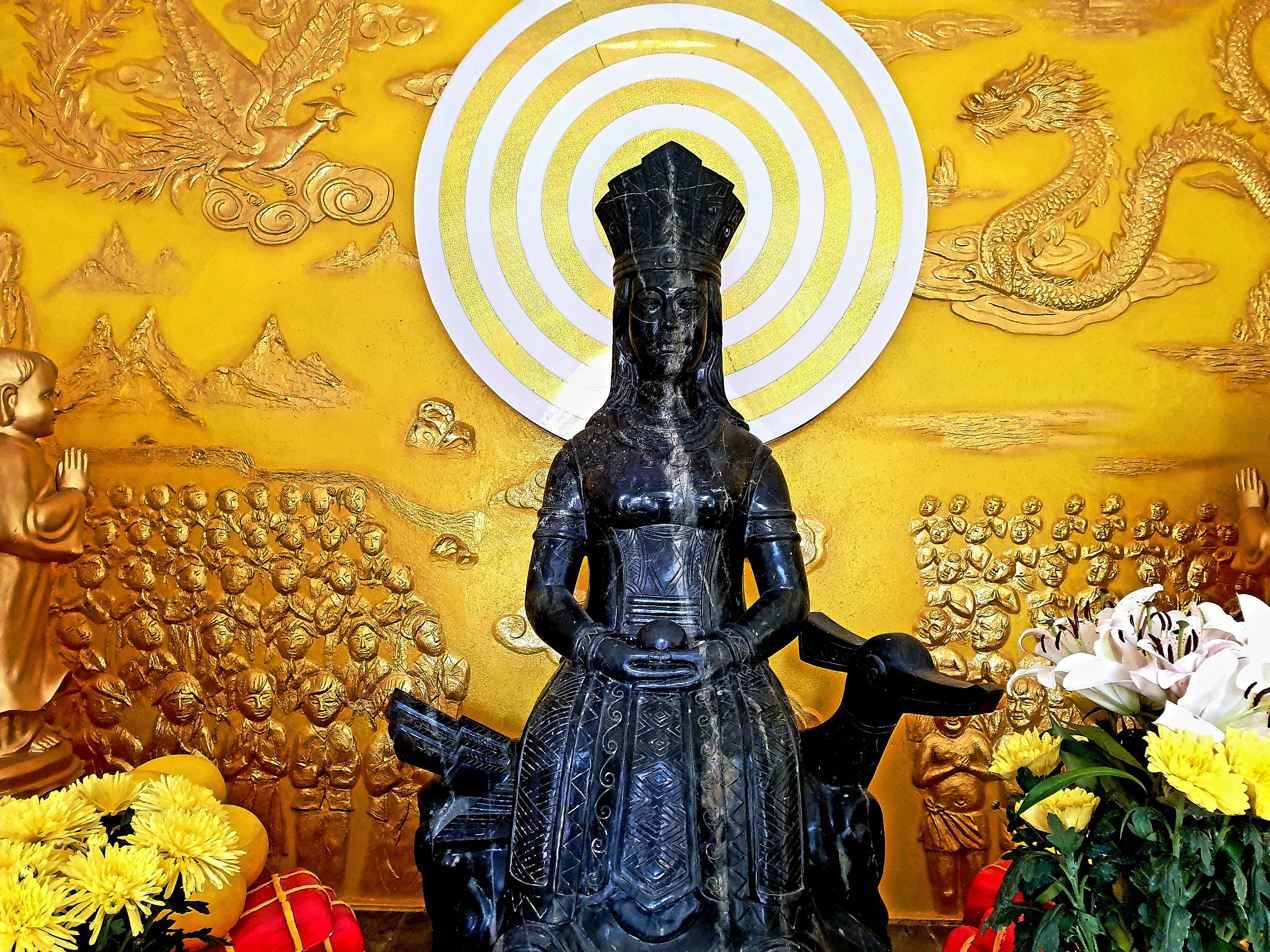
Âu Cơ statue at Kỳ Quang Temple

Âu Cơ was a beautiful tiên (immortal) who lived high in the snow-capped mountains. She traveled to help those who suffered from illnesses since she was very skillful in medicine and had a sympathetic heart. One day, a monster suddenly appeared before her while she was on her travels. It frightened her, so she transformed into a crane to fly away. Lạc Long Quân, the dragon king from the sea, passed by and saw the crane in danger. He grabbed a nearby rock and killed the monster with it. When Âu Cơ stopped flying to see the very person that saved her, she turned back into a tiên (immortal) and instantly fell in love with her savior. She soon bore an egg sac, from which hatched a hundred children. However, despite their love for each other, Âu Cơ had always desired to be in the mountains again and Lạc Long Quân, too, yearned for the sea where the length of days are measured by seasons. They separated, each taking 50 children. Âu Cơ settled in the Vietnamese snow-covered mountains where she raised fifty young, intelligent, strong leaders, later known as the Hùng Vương, Hùng kings.

== In Vietnamese literature ==
The books Đại Việt sử ký toàn thư (from the 15th century) and Lĩnh Nam chích quái (Wonders plucked from the dust of Linh-nam, from the 14th century) mention the legend. In Đại Việt sử ký toàn thư Âu Cơ is the daughter of Đế Lai (also known as Đế Ai 帝哀, or Emperor Ai, who was a descendant of Shennong), while in Lĩnh Nam chích quái, Âu Cơ was Đế Lai's concubine before she married off to Lạc Long Quân. Additionally in Lĩnh Nam chích quái, Âu Cơ gave birth to an egg sac but threw it away in the field, believing the egg sac to carry bad omens. Ngô Sĩ Liên commented in the sử ký on the somewhat primitive nature of the relationship between the two progenitors, given that Lạc's father Kinh Dương Vương and Âu's grandfather Đế Nghi were brothers. (Note: The text reads: According to the Addendum to the Tongjian, Đế Lai was Đế Nghi's son; as such, that they[, Lạc and Âu,] still married even though Kinh Dương Vương was Đế Nghi's younger brother, would it be because they didn't know the proper conduct back in those primitive times?) The story of Âu Cơ and Lạc Long Quân is taught widely in Vietnamese schools.

In her pamphlet about the Vietnam War, called simply "Vietnam", the American author Mary McCarthy mentions the use of the Vietnamese creation myth by American agents seeking to rally patriotic support for South Vietnam.

== Sources ==
- Friedman, Amy. "One Hundred Kings – a Legend of Ancient Vietnam", South Florida Sun Sentinel, 12 July 2005, pg. 8
- Taylor, Sandra C. Vietnamese Women at War (Kansas: University Press of Kansas, 1999)
- Turner, Karen Gottschang. Even the Women Must Fight (New York: John Wiley & Sons, Inc., 1998)
- Willing, Indigo A. “The Adopted Vietnamese Community: From Fairy Tales to the Diaspora”, Michigan Quarterly Review 43, no. 4 (2004)
