= Mẫu Thượng Ngàn =

- Goddess of the mountains and forests
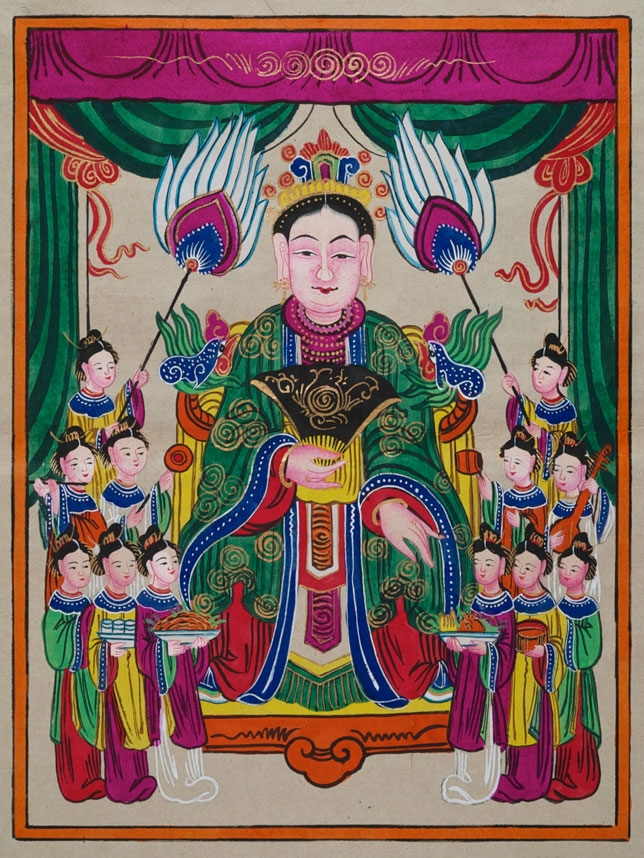
- Mẫu Thượng Ngàn in Hàng Trống painting
- Parents: Tản Viên Sơn Thánh and Mỵ Nương Ngọc Hoa

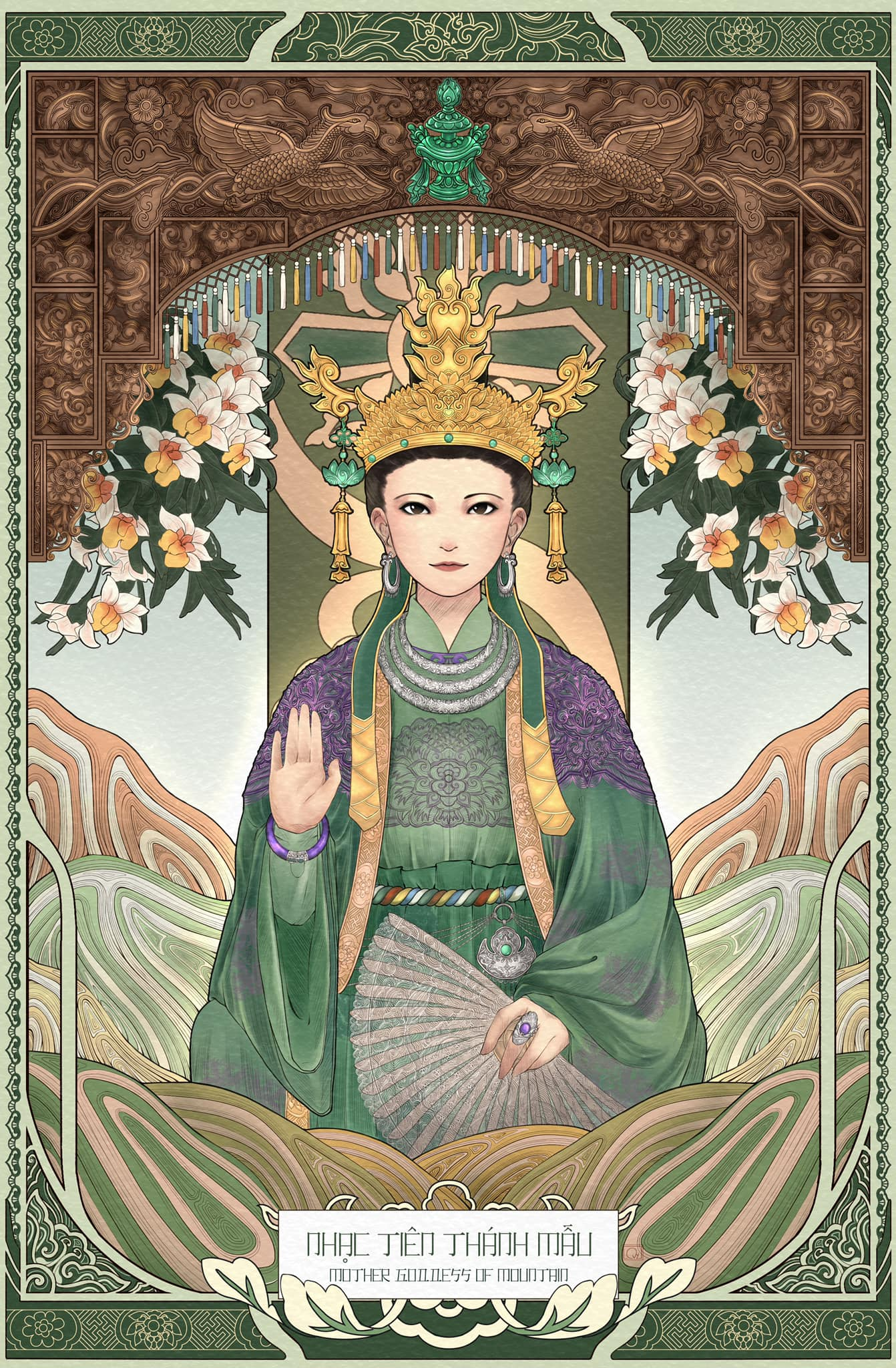
Mẫu Thượng Ngàn in a costume of the Lê dynasty (a painting by a modern artist)

Lâm Cung Thánh Mẫu (Chữ Hán: 林宮聖母) or Mẫu Thượng Ngàn or Bà Chúa Thượng Ngàn (Princess of the Forest) is ruler of the Forest Palace among the spirits of the Four Palaces in Vietnamese indigenous religion. In legend the Princess of the Forest was the daughter of prince Tản Viên Sơn Thánh (Sơn Tinh) and Mỵ Nương King Hung's daughter from the legend of the rivalry between Sơn Tinh and the sea god Thủy Tinh. Many natural features around Vietnam feature shrines to her, such as the Suối Mỡ thermal springs area near the town of Bắc Giang.
