= Mẫu Thoải =

Traditional Vietnamese goddess

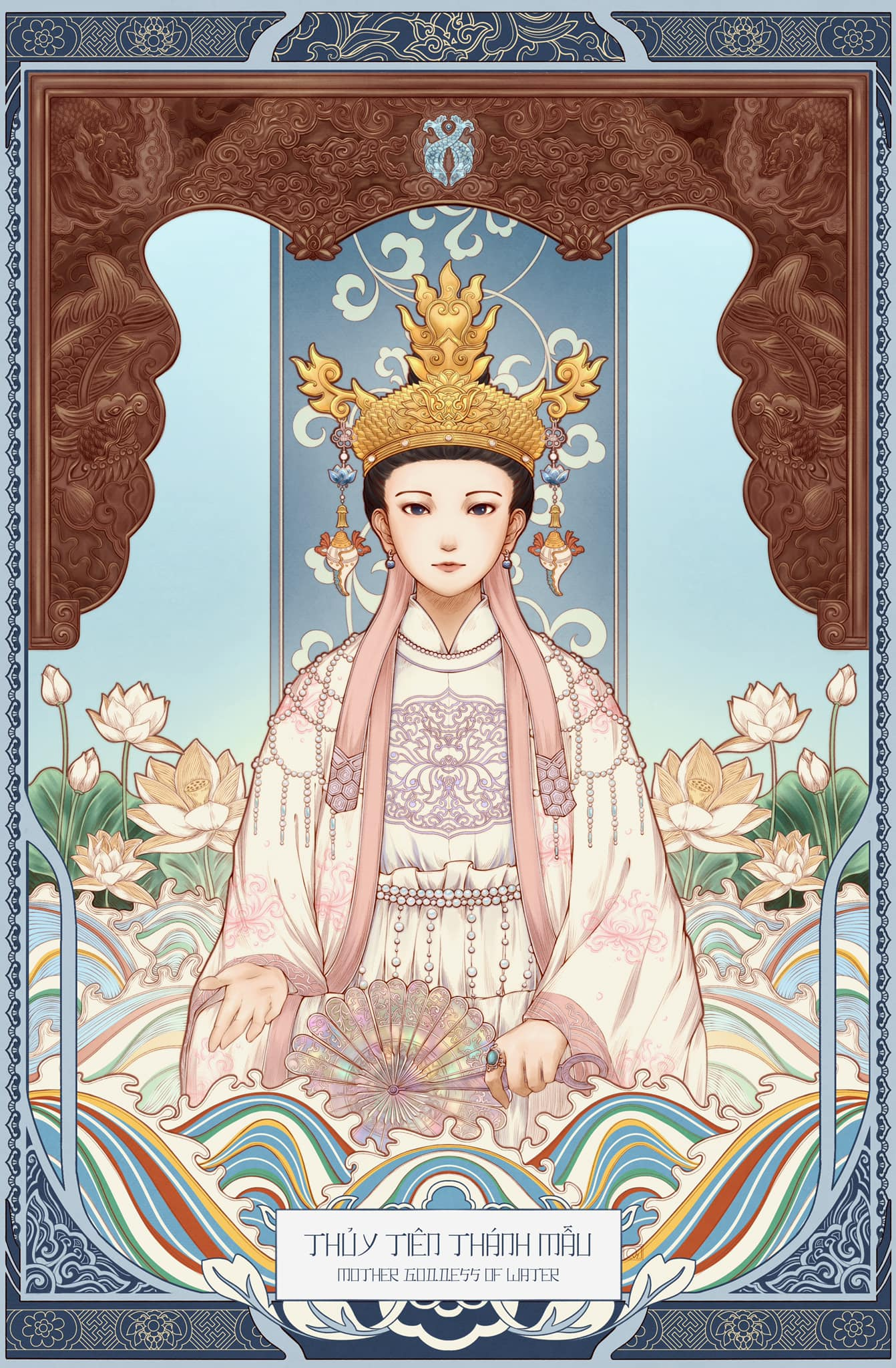
Mẫu Thoải in a costume of the Lê dynasty (a painting by a modern artist)

Mẫu Thoải (Chữ Hán: 母水, or Thủy Cung Thánh Mẫu (Chữ Hán: 水宮聖母) is a goddess in Vietnamese non-Buddhist traditional religion. The goddess features in Chầu văn religious ceremonies and music.

She presides over the heavenly water palace Thoải Phủ, one of the Four Palaces (Tứ Phủ) where the "spirits of the Four Palaces" (thánh Tứ Phủ) correspond to the elements.
