= Vietnamese philosophy =

Vietnamese philosophy includes Confucian philosophy, Vietnamese local religious traditions, Buddhist philosophy and later introducing French, Marxist and other influences.

== Confucianism ==
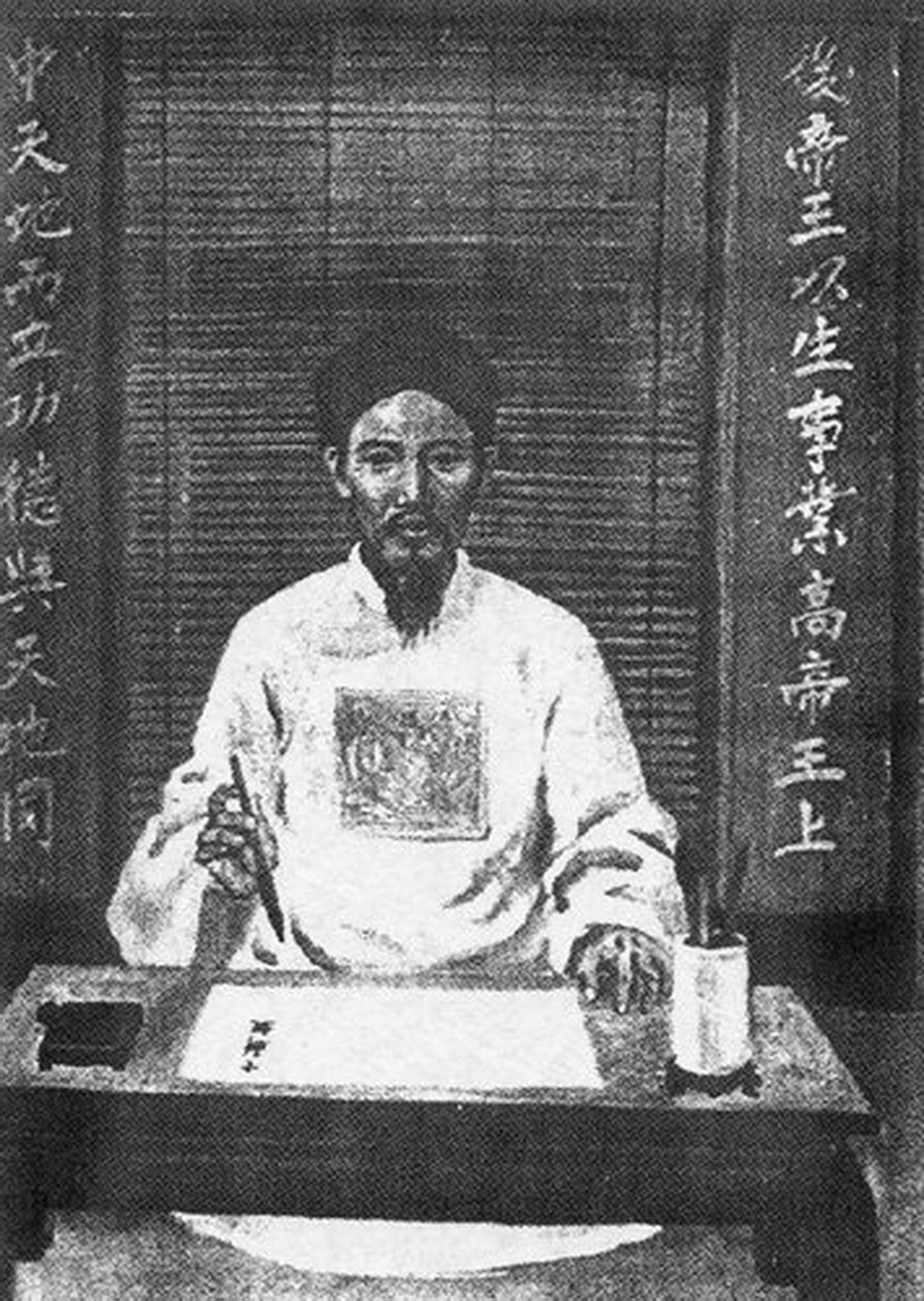
Portrait of Chu Văn An (1292–1370), a Vietnamese Confucianist teacher in 14th century (in the picture, he wears a costume of the Nguyễn dynasty because the picture was painted in the Nguyễn dynasty).

Confucianism entered Vietnam and was later reinforced in the four Bắc thuộc periods of Chinese domination, beginning with the first Chinese domination of Vietnam from 111 BCE. This was also the beginning of Taoism in Vietnam and Buddhism in Vietnam. Confucianism was reinforced in government by the Confucian court examination system in Vietnam, and the way family raised and taught children toward filial piety, through absolute obedience.

Due to the influence of Confucianism, the feudal state of Vietnam placed emphasis on expanding education, with a focus on nurturing talented individuals and compiling historical records. As a result, the people became studious, respected teachers, and valued their culture. These factors collectively contributed to Vietnam being a country with a civilization predating some others in the region. Confucianism also played a role in fortifying social order and fostering neighborly relationships.

Confucianism has been utilized as a tool by authoritarian regimes to uphold the status quo, sometimes transforming loyalty into an impediment to challenging oppressive forces. This has led to the suppression of dissent and the subjugation of those at the lower rungs of society. While Confucianism promoted cultural and intellectual pursuits, it predominantly emphasized literature and history, sometimes at the expense of science and technology. The pursuit of knowledge was sometimes driven by a desire for scholarly recognition, leading to a focus on fame and position rather than freedom, independence, and self-reliance. Living in harmony and stability has its allure, while it sometimes requires compliance, tolerance, deference to authority, and a reluctance to engage in reform and progress.

== Study of philosophy ==
Most research on Vietnamese philosophy is conducted by modern Vietnamese scholars. The traditional Vietnamese philosophy has been described by one biographer of Ho Chi Minh (Brocheux, 2007) as a "perennial Sino-Vietnamese philosophy" blending different strands of Confucianism with Buddhism and Taoism. Some researchers have found the empirical evidence of this "blending" and defined the socio-cultural phenomenon as "cultural additivity". Another, Catholic, writer (Vu, 1966) has analysed Vietnamese philosophy as constituted of tam tài ("three body" Heaven, Man, Earth) philosophy, yin-yang metaphysics, and agricultural philosophy. Tran Van Doan, professor of philosophy at National Taiwan University (1996) considers that Vietnamese philosophy is humanistic but not anthropocentric.
