= John Steinbeck IV =

American journalist and author

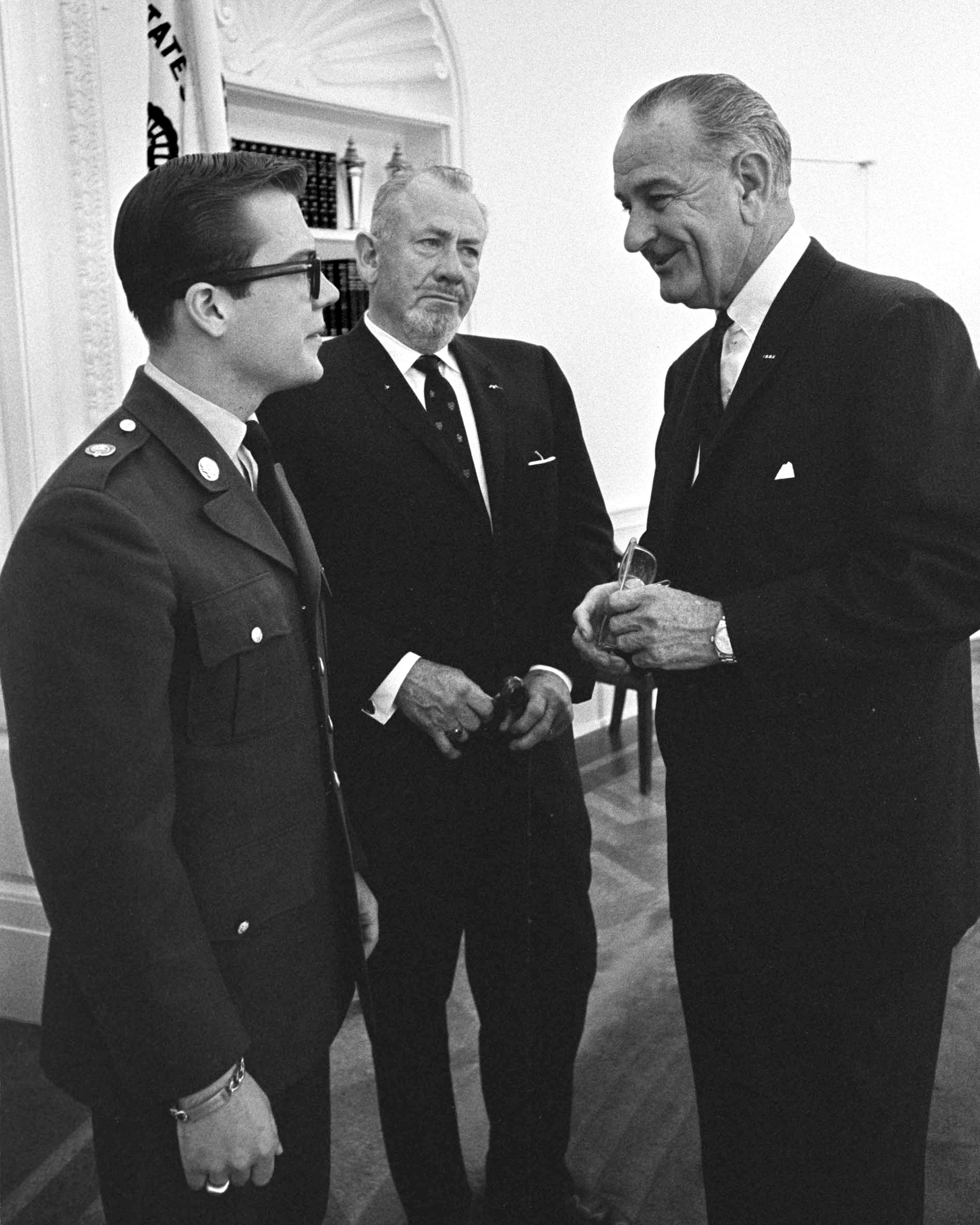
- John Steinbeck at 19 (left) with father John (center) visiting President Lyndon B. Johnson in the Oval Office, May 16, 1966.
- Born: John Ernst Steinbeck IV; June 12, 1946; New York City, U.S.
- Died: February 7, 1991 (aged 44); Encinitas, California, U.S.
- Occupations: Writer, war correspondent
- Spouse: Nancy Steinbeck
- Parent(s): John Steinbeck (father); Gwyndolyn Conger (mother)
- Relatives: Thomas Steinbeck (brother)
- Writing career
- Notable works: In Touch; The Other Side of Eden: Life with John Steinbeck
- Movement: Coconut Cult

John Ernst Steinbeck IV (June 12, 1946 – February 7, 1991) was an American journalist and author. He was the second child of the Nobel laureate author John Ernst Steinbeck and his second wife, singer-composer Gwyndolyn "Gwyn" Conger. In 1965, he was drafted into the United States Army and served in Vietnam. He worked as a journalist for Armed Forces Radio and TV, and as a war correspondent for the United States Department of Defense.

== Biography ==
In March 1968 he testified before a Senate subcommittee that in his opinion "about 60 percent of American soldiers between the ages of 19 and 27 smoke marijuana when they think it reasonable to do just that, taking into consideration their responsibilities at the moment." He also said that Military Assistance Command, Vietnam itself promoted drug abuse by providing for distribution of narcotics such as amphetamines, also known as pep pills, to soldiers in combat.

In 1968, Steinbeck returned to South Vietnam as a journalist. Along with Sean Flynn (the son of actor Errol Flynn), he contributed to Dispatch News Service, which originally published Seymour Hersh's story on the My Lai massacre. Fluent in street Vietnamese, Flynn and Steinbeck quickly became independent of the flow of information dispensed by the United States Press Office, enabling them to discover the truth about the My Lai massacre and the Con Son Island prison "tiger cages". Flynn disappeared after being taken as a prisoner of war during a photo shoot in Cambodia.

Steinbeck's Vietnam memoir In Touch was published by Knopf in 1969. He wrote about his experiences with the Vietnamese and GIs. Steinbeck took the vows of a Buddhist monk while living on Phoenix Island in the Mekong Delta, under the tutelage of the Coconut Monk, a silent tree-dwelling mystic yogi who adopted Steinbeck as a spiritual son. Amid the raging war, Steinbeck stayed in the monk's "peace zone", where the 400 monks who lived on the island hammered howitzer shell casings into bells.

While in Saigon, Steinbeck participated in Michael Rubbo's 1970 documentary film Sad Song of Yellow Skin, as part of a group of young American journalists practicing a New Journalism approach to covering the war.

Steinbeck traveled back and forth between Asia and the United States several more times before settling in Boulder, Colorado, where he studied Tibetan Buddhism with Chögyam Trungpa. On March 6, 1982, he married Nancy Harper, who had two children from a previous marriage; Steinbeck also had a child of his own. In 1983, the family traveled around the world for a year, living in Kathmandu to pursue their Buddhist studies.

In 1984, Steinbeck was diagnosed with hemochromatosis, a genetic disease that causes iron retention. After years of heavy drinking, he quit in 1988. He became very interested in alcoholism's genetic aspects, and participated in twelve-step programs.

It was Steinbeck who broke the story of Ösel Tendzin's AIDS status to the Boulder press. A renewal of his journalistic career ensued as he wrote about the Dalai Lama, Tibetan Buddhism, and alcoholism. In 1990, he began his autobiography as follows:

The reasons for attempting to write this book could be summed up simply by my desire to live free from fear. However, the path leading to that sort of fruition has, along its border, a lot of fearful things that at first glance can cause panic, or resentment, or shame. There is also charity and sanity, which accompany this sort of voyage like good dolphins on a good quest. Frankly, I feel blessed that these guiding elements have never abandoned me and, as I and others continue to recover from the effects of my actions, I am encouraged that these qualities will endure, even shine.

In 1990, Steinbeck was diagnosed with a ruptured disc. He underwent corrective surgery on February 7, 1991, and died immediately after the operation. In 2001, his posthumous memoir The Other Side of Eden: Life With John Steinbeck was published by Prometheus Books. The book jacket reads: "Left unfinished at his untimely death, this testament to his life is here reconstructed by Nancy Steinbeck. Interweaving her own reminiscences of her life with John Steinbeck IV, Nancy has created an engrossing account from two perspectives: John's memories of his chaotic and adventurous upbringing and her own thoughts on their journey together to make a new life apart from the long shadow of a famous father and a troubled past." The book was co-distributed by the Hazelden Foundation, a treatment center for drug and alcohol addiction. Publishers Weekly said, "More than a memoir, this is a powerful account of healing and liberation. This book can help many people."
