= Religion in Vietnam =

Religion in Vietnam (2023)
1. Irreligion/folk religion (76.5%)
2. Buddhism (13.3%)
3. Catholicism (6.60%)
4. Hoahaoism Buddhism (1.40%)
5. Caodaism (1.00%)
6. Protestantism (1.00%)
7. Others (0.20%)

The majority of Vietnamese do not follow any organized religion, instead participating in one or more practices of folk religions, such as venerating ancestors, or praying to deities, especially during Tết and other festivals. Folk religions were founded on endemic cultural beliefs that were historically affected by Confucianism and Taoism from ancient China, as well as by various strands of Buddhism (Phật giáo). These three teachings or tam giáo were later joined by Christianity (Catholicism, Công giáo) which has become a significant presence. Vietnam is also home of two indigenous religions: syncretic Caodaism (Đạo Cao Đài) and quasi-Buddhist Hoahaoism (Phật giáo Hòa Hảo).

Officially, the Socialist Republic of Vietnam is an atheist state, although its constitution guarantees freedom of religion. While the communist government implemented atheistic policies and severely restricted religious freedom from 1975 to the late 1980s, Vietnam's current constitution explicitly protects religious freedom under Article 24, stating that "all religions are equal before the law."

According to statistics from the Government Committee for Religious Affairs, as of 2023, Buddhists account for 13.3% of the total population, Christians 7.6% (Catholics 6.6% & Protestants 1%), Hoahao Buddhists 1.4%, and Caodaism followers 1%. Other religions include Hinduism, Islam, and Baháʼí Faith, representing less than 0.2% of the population combined. Folk religions (worship of ancestors, gods and goddesses), not included in government statistics, have experienced revival since the 1980s.

== Overview ==
Although according to a 1999 census most Vietnamese list themselves as having no religious affiliation, religion, as defined by shared beliefs and practices, remains an integral part of Vietnamese life, dictating the social behaviours and spiritual practices of Vietnamese individuals in Vietnam and abroad. The triple religion (Vietnamese: tam giáo), referring to the syncretic combination of Mahayana Buddhism, Confucianism, and Taoism, and Vietnamese folk religion (often assimilated), remain a strong influence on the beliefs and practices of the Vietnamese, even if the levels of formal membership in these religious communities may not reflect that influence. One of the most notable and universal spiritual practices common to Vietnamese is ancestor veneration. It is considered an expression of hiếu thảo (filial piety), a key virtue to maintain a harmonious society. Regardless of formal religious affiliation, it is very common to have an altar in the home and business where prayers are offered to their ancestors. These offerings and practices are done frequently during important traditional or religious celebrations (e.g., death anniversaries), the starting of a new business, or even when a family member needs guidance or counsel. Belief in ghosts and spirits is very common; many believe that the traditions are important links to culture and history and are enjoyable, while others believe that failing to perform the proper rituals for one's ancestors will literally cause them to become hungry ghosts (Vietnamese: ma đói). (Note: "If properly buried and worshipped, the dead would be happy to remain in their realm and act as benevolent spirits for their progeny. But those who died alone and neglected, and to whom no worship was given, disturbed the dead and preyed on the living." Hue-Tam Ho Tai (2008-08-20). "Religion in Vietnam: A World of Gods and Spirits". Asia Society. p. 1.)

A 2002 Pew Research Center report claimed that 24% of the population of Vietnam view religion as "very important".

== History ==
The earliest forms of Vietnamese religious practice were animistic and totemic in nature. The decorations on Đông Sơn bronze drums, generally agreed to have ceremonial and possibly religious value, (Note: "It is generally agreed that Dong Son drums were used for ceremonial purposes (e.g. Higham 1996: 133), and it could be argued that they were produced within a particular religious context, so we might talk about Dong Son religion, in the sense we talk about the Buddhist religion, as a cultural production but one which we know little about specifically." Bowdler, Sandra (2006). Bacus, Elisabeth A.; Glover, Ian; Pigott, Vincent C. (eds.). "The Hoabinhian: Early Evidence for SE Asian Trade Networks?". Uncovering Southeast Asia's Past: Selected Papers from the 10th International Conference of the European Association of Southeast Asian Archaeologists. National University of Singapore: 357.) depict the figures of birds, leading historians to believe birds were objects of worship for the early Vietnamese. Dragons were another frequently recurring figure in Vietnamese art, arising from the veneration of Lạc Long Quân, a mythical dragon-king who is said to be the father of the Vietnamese people. The Golden Turtle God Kim Quy was said to appear to emperors in times of crisis, notably to Lê Lợi, from whom he took the legendary sword Thuận Thiên after it had been dropped into Hoàn Kiếm Lake. Contact with Chinese civilization, and the introduction of the triple religion of Buddhism, Confucianism and Daoism, added a further ethical and moral dimension to the indigenous Vietnamese religion. A recent research using folkloristic computations has provided evidence on the existence of "cultural additivity" by examining the interaction of Buddhism, Confucianism and Daoism throughout the history of Vietnam.

=== Statistics ===
Varied sources indicate very different statistics of religious groups in Vietnam.

Religious group		% Population 2009	% Population 2010	% Population 2014	% Population 2018	% Population 2019	% Population 2023
Vietnamese folk religion		81.6%	45.3%	73.1%	73.52%	86.32%	76.5%
Non-religion/atheism		81.6%	29.6%	73.1%	73.52%	86.32%	76.5%
Buddhism		7.9%	16.4%	12.2%	14.91%	4.79%	13.3%
Christianity		7.5%	8.2%	8.4%	8.44%	7.10%	7.6%
└	Catholicism	6.6%	n/a	6.9%	7.35%	6.10%	6.6%
└	Protestantism	0.9%	n/a	1.5%	1.09%	1.00%	1.00%
Hoahaoism		1.6%	n/a	1.4%	1.47%	1.02%	1.4%
Caodaism		1.0%	n/a	4.8%	1.16%	0.58%	1%
Other religions		0.2%	0.5%	0.1%	0.50%	0.19%	0.2%

=== Statistics controversy ===
Government statistics of the religion in Vietnam are counts of members of religious organization recognized by the government. Hence, this does not include people practicing folk religion, which is not recognized by government. Also, many people practice religion such as Buddhism without taking any membership of specific government organization. Official statistics from the 2019 census, also not categorizing folk religion, indicate that Catholicism is the largest (organized) religion in Vietnam, surpassing Buddhism. While some other surveys reported 45–50 million Buddhist living in Vietnam, the government statistics counted 6.8 million. The Buddhist Sangha of Vietnam, however, does not report official statistics on its adherents. The great gaps in statistics on the number of Buddhist adherents is due to disagreement on the very criteria of what constitute a Buddhist.

== Folk religions ==
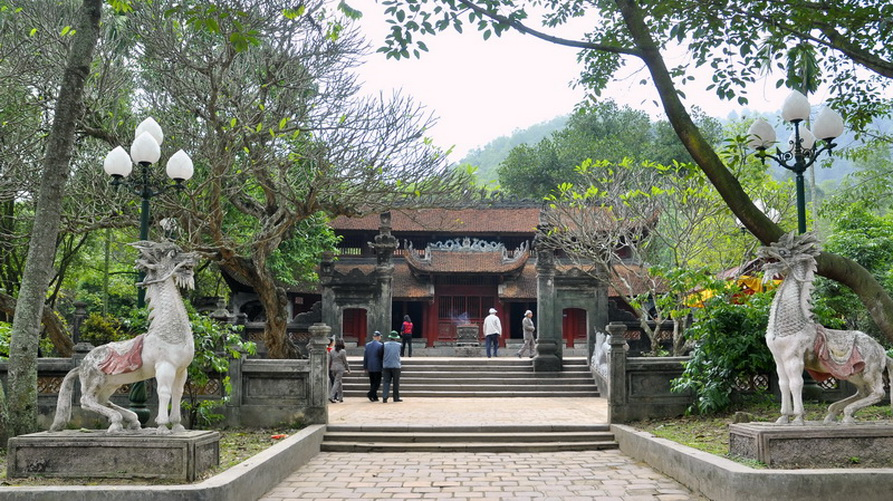
Sóc Temple in Sóc Sơn, Hanoi. Place to worship Thánh Gióng.

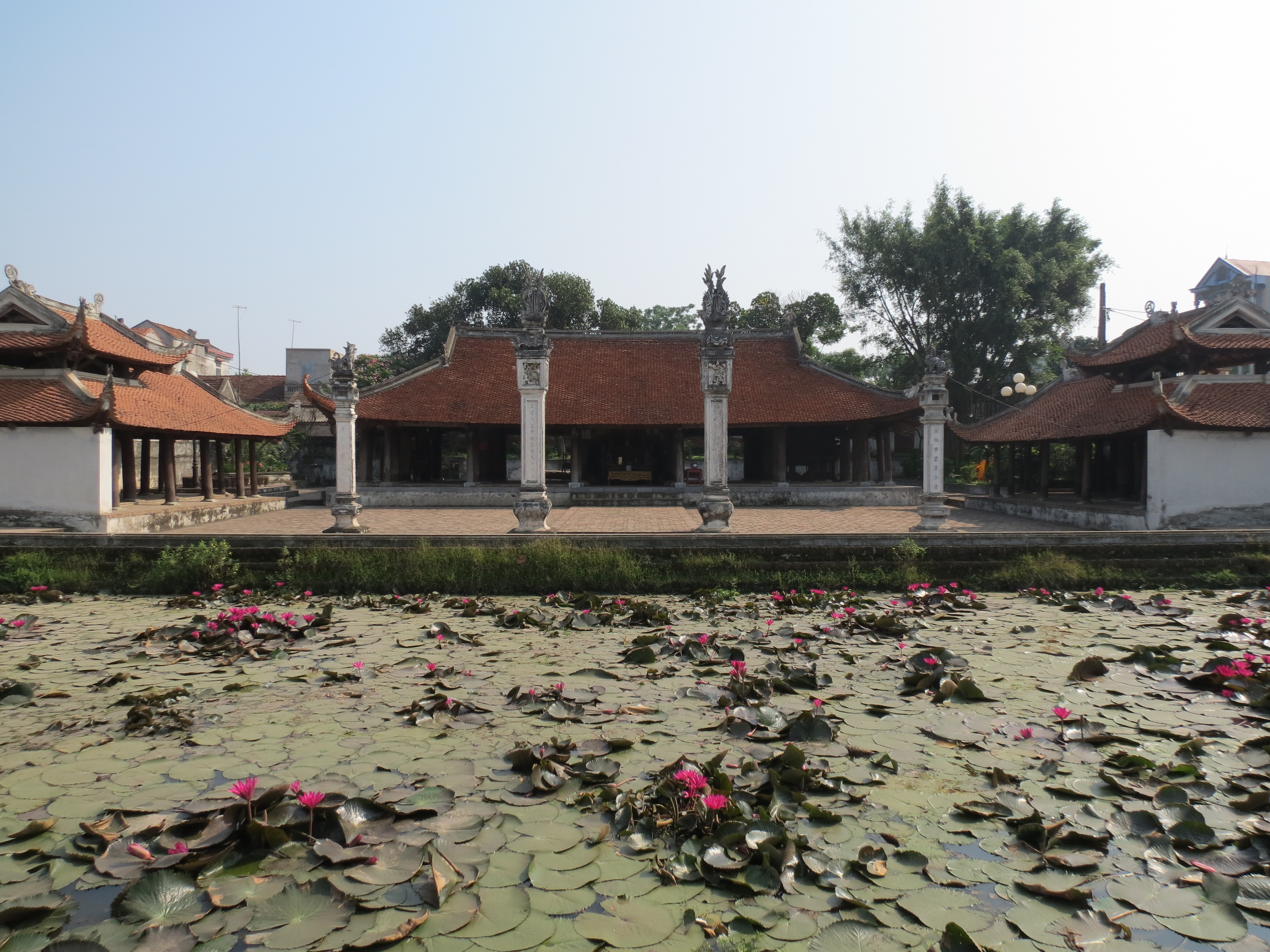
A đình or Vietnamese communal temple in Tây Đằng, Hanoi.

Scholars such as Toan Ánh (Tín ngưỡng Việt Nam 1991) have listed a resurgence in traditional belief in many local, village-level, spirits.

=== Đạo Mẫu ===
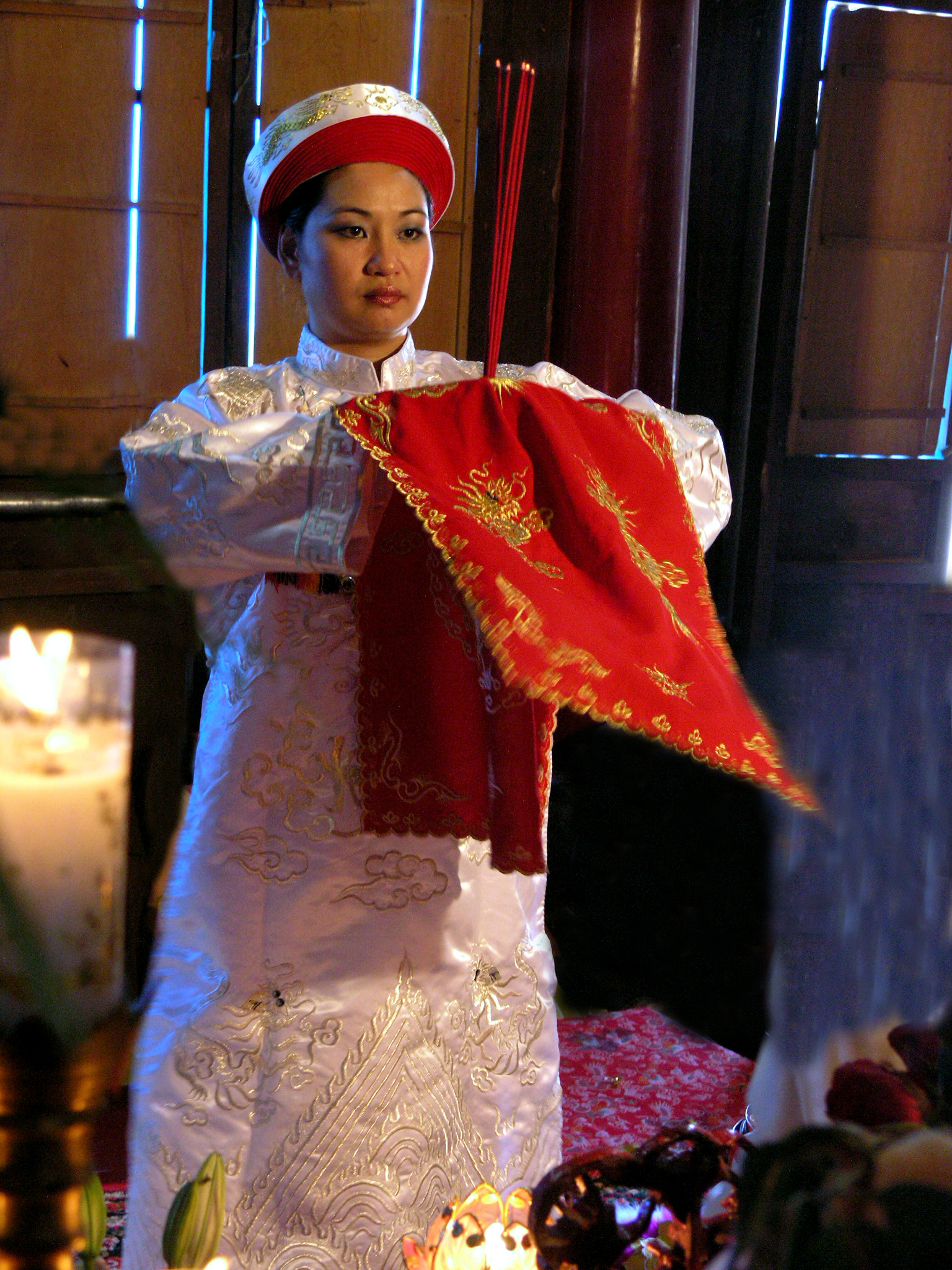
A lên đồng practitioner performs in a temple.

Đạo Mẫu is a branch of shamanism of Vietnamese folk religion, it is the worship of mother goddesses in Vietnam. There are distinct beliefs and practices in this religion including the worship of goddesses such as Thiên Y A Na, Bà Chúa Xứ, Bà Chúa Kho and Liễu Hạnh, legendary figures like Âu Cơ, the Trưng Sisters (Hai Bà Trưng), Lady Triệu (Bà Triệu), and the cult of the Four Palaces. Đạo Mẫu is commonly associated with spirit mediumship rituals—known in Vietnam as lên đồng. It is a ritual in which followers become spirit mediums for various deities. The Communist government used to suspend the practice of lên đồng due to its superstition, but in 1987, the government legalized this practice.

=== Đạo Dừa ===
Ông Đạo Dừa (1909–1990) created the Coconut Religion (Vietnamese: Đạo Dừa or Hòa đồng Tôn giáo), a syncretic Buddhist, Christian and local Vietnamese religion which at its peak had 4,000 followers, before it was banned. Its adherents ate coconut and drank coconut milk. In 1975 the Reunited Vietnam authorities forced this religion to go underground.

== Minority faiths ==
=== Buddhism ===
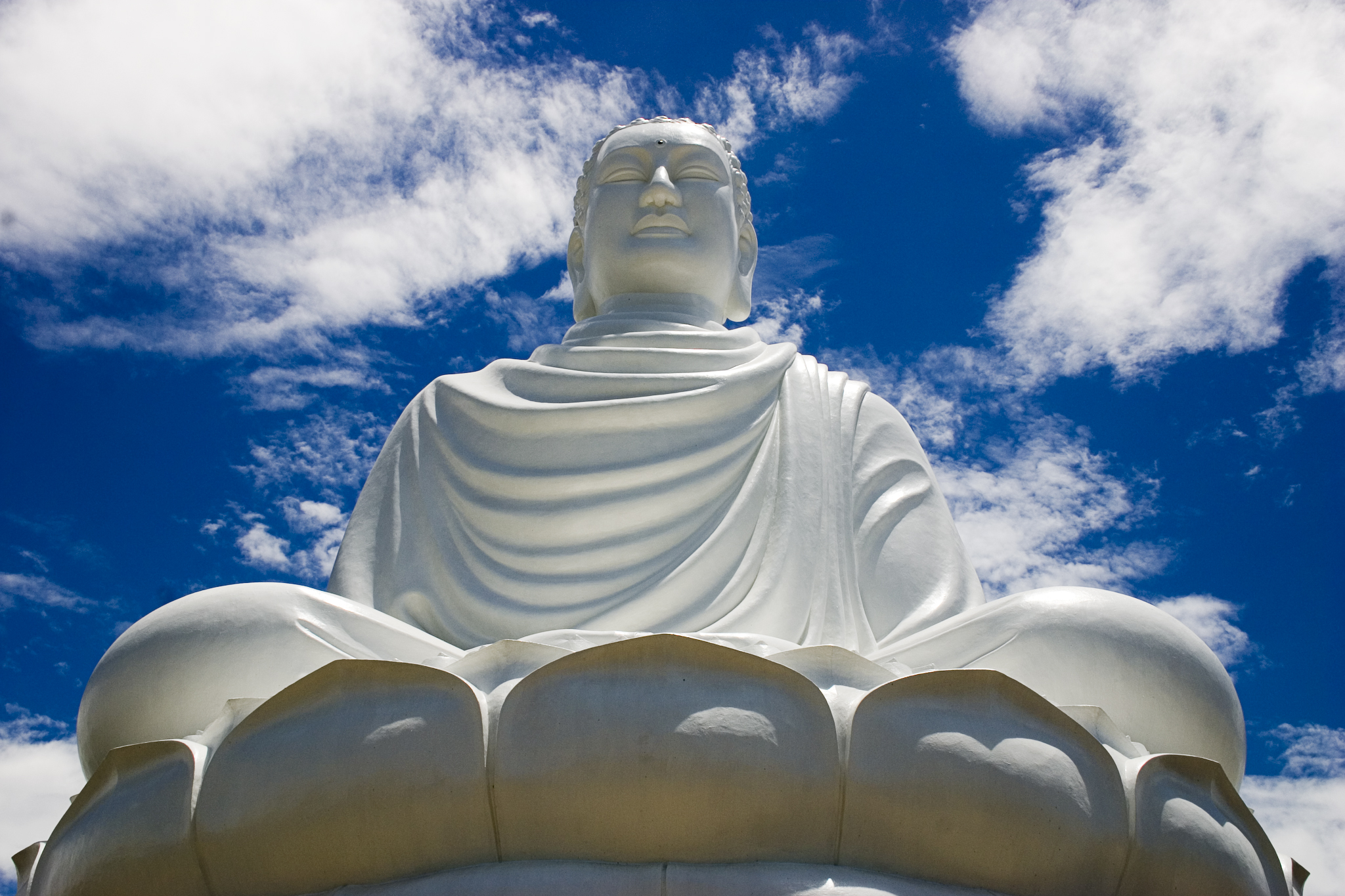
Gautama Buddha at Long Sơn Temple, Nha Trang.

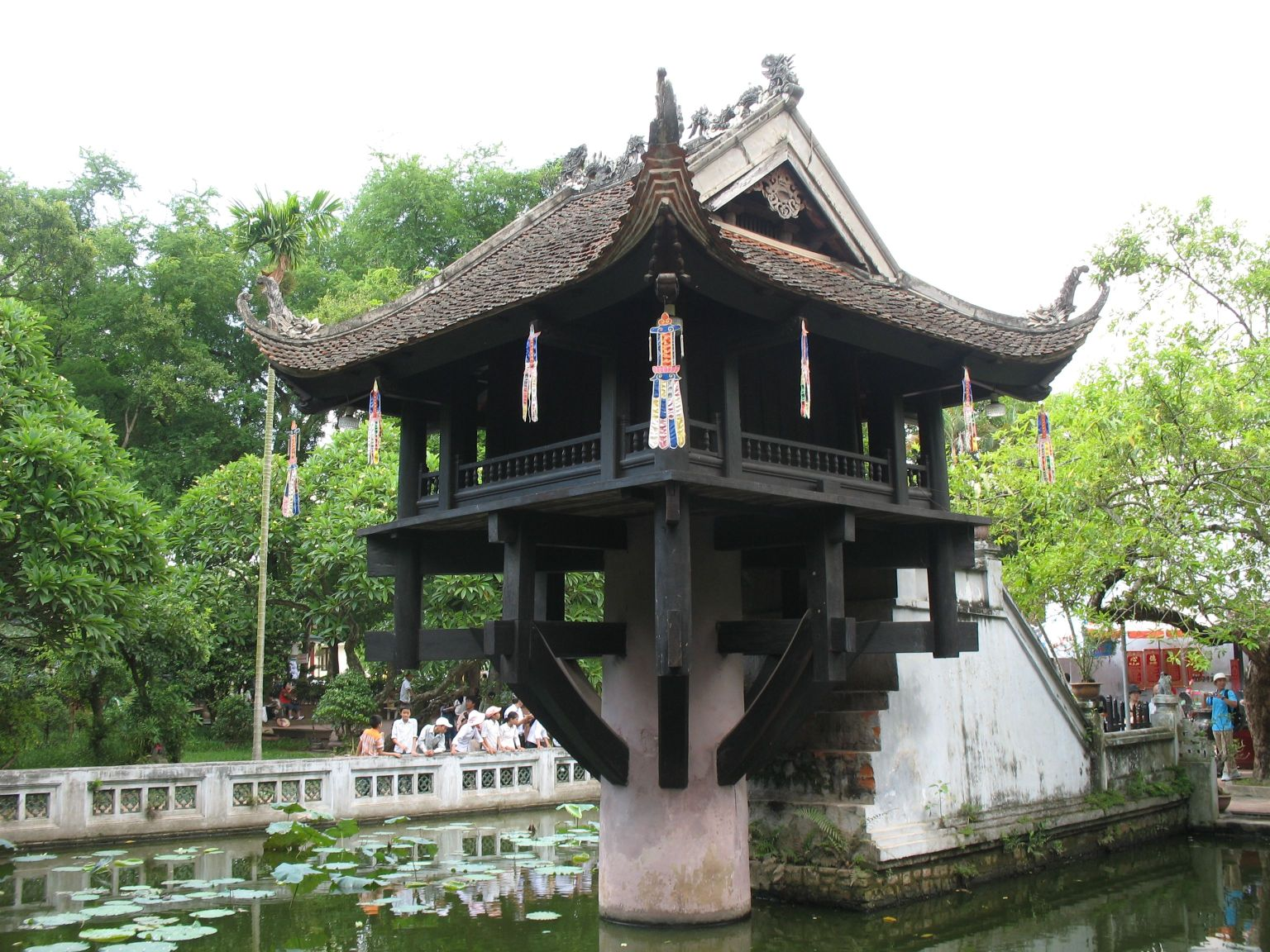
Hanoi's reconstructed One Pillar Pagoda, a historic Buddhist temple.

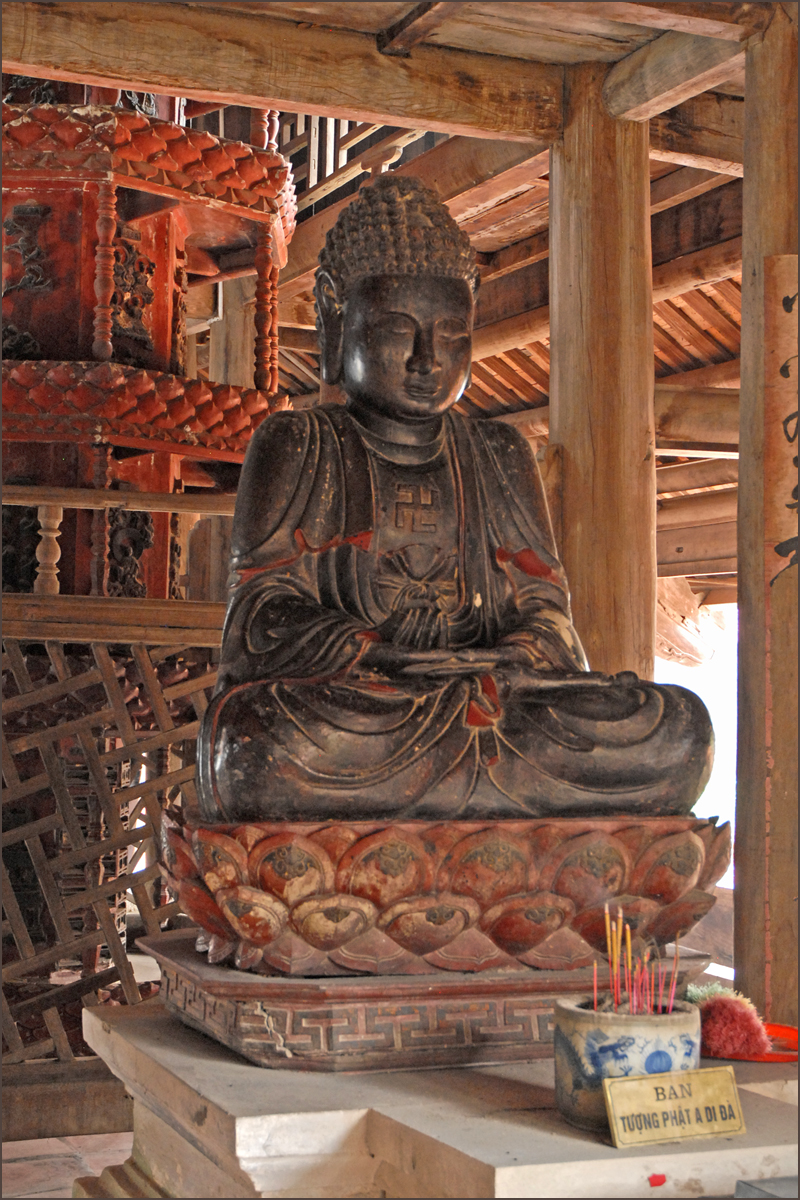
Amitabha Buddha statue at Bút Tháp Temple.

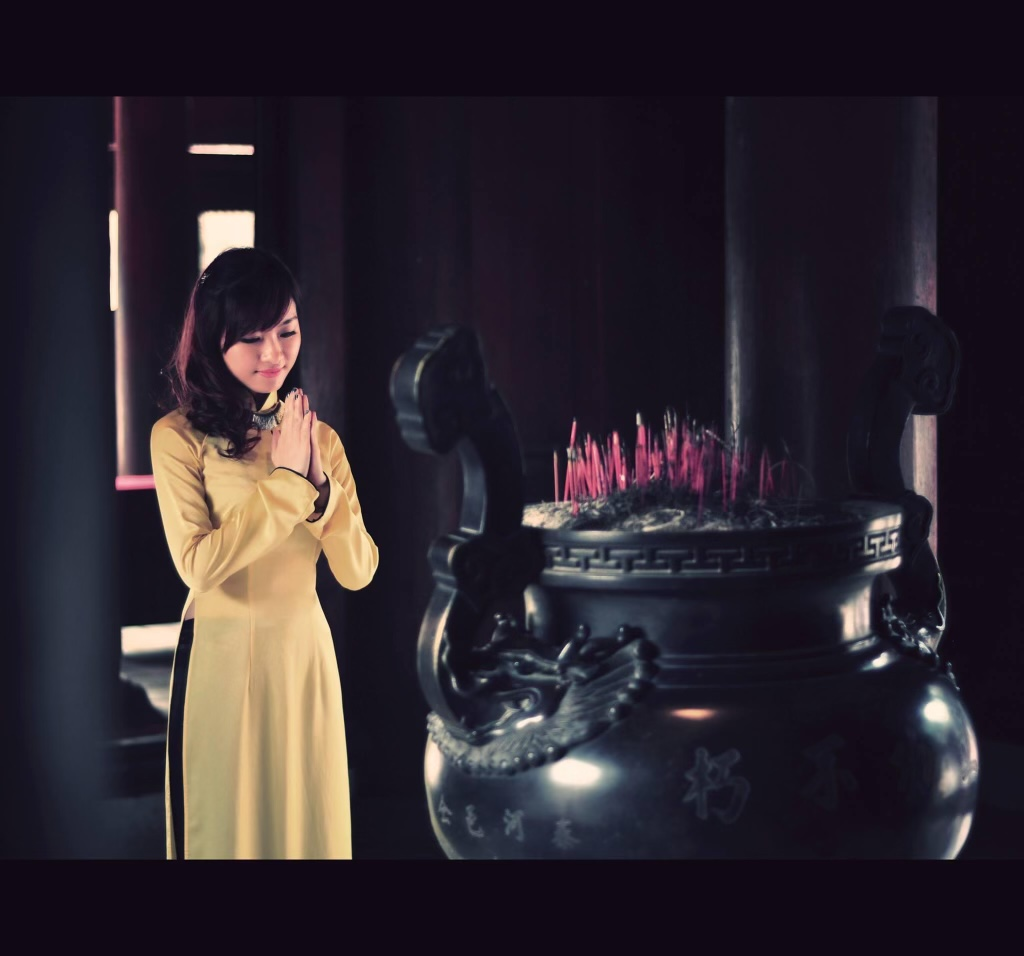
Vietnamese girl in Áo dài offering incense

Buddhism came to Vietnam as early as the second century CE through the North from China and via Southern routes from India. Mahayana Buddhism first spread from India via sea to Vietnam around 100 CE. During the 15th and 16th centuries, Theravāda became established as the state religion in Cambodia and also spread to Cambodians living in the Mekong Delta, replaced Mahayana. Buddhism as practiced by the ethnic Vietnamese is mainly of the Mahayana school, although some ethnic minorities (such as the Khmer Krom in the southern Delta region of Vietnam) adhere to the Theravada school.

Today, more than half of the Vietnamese population, consider themselves as adherents of Mahayana Buddhism. Theravada and Hòa Hảo Buddhism are also present in significant numbers. Buddhist practice in Vietnam differs from that of other Asian countries, and does not contain the same institutional structures, hierarchy, or sanghas that exist in other traditional Buddhist settings. It has instead grown from a symbiotic relationship with Taoism, Chinese spirituality, and the indigenous Vietnamese religion, with the majority of Buddhist practitioners focusing on devotional rituals rather than meditation.

==== Thiền tông ====
Chan Buddhism arrived in Vietnam as early as the 6th century CE, with the works of Vinītaruci. It flourished under the Lý and Trần dynasties. Trúc Lâm Zen is the only native school of Buddhism in Vietnam.

==== Pure Land ====
Pure Land Buddhism is a broad branch of Mahayana Buddhism and is said to be one of the most popular schools of Buddhism in Vietnam, in which practitioners commonly recite sutras, chants and dharani looking to gain protection from bodhisattvas or Dharma-Protectors. While Pure Land traditions, practices and concepts are found within Mahayana cosmology, and form an important component of Buddhist traditions in Vietnam, Pure Land Buddhism was not independently recognized as a sect of Buddhism (as Pure Land schools have been recognized, for example, in Japan) until 2007, with the official recognition of the Vietnamese Pure Land Buddhism Association as an independent and legal religious organization.

==== Hòa Hảo ====
Hòa Hảo is a religious tradition, based on Buddhism, founded in 1939 by Huỳnh Phú Sổ, a native of the Mekong Delta region of southern Vietnam. Adherents consider Sổ to be a prophet, and Hòa Hảo a continuation of a 19th-century Buddhist ministry known as Bửu Sơn Kỳ Hương ("Strange Perfume from Precious Mountains", referring to the Thất Sơn range on the Vietnam-Cambodia border). The founders of these traditions are regarded by Hòa Hảo followers as living Buddhas—destined to save mankind from suffering and to protect the Vietnamese nation. An important characteristic of Hòa Hảo is its emphasis on peasant farmers, exemplified by the old slogan "Practicing Buddhism While Farming Your Land." Hòa Hảo also stresses the practice of Buddhism by lay people in the home, rather than focusing primarily on temple worship and ordination. Aid to the poor is favored over pagoda building or expensive rituals.

Today, as an officially recognized religion, it claims approximately two million followers throughout Vietnam; in certain parts of the Mekong Delta, as many as 90 percent of the population of this region practice this tradition. Since many of the teachings of Huỳnh Phú Sổ related in some way to Vietnamese nationalism, adherence to Hòa Hảo outside of Vietnam has been minimal, with a largely quiescent group of followers presumed to exist among the Vietnamese diaspora in the United States.

==== Tứ Ân Hiếu Nghĩa ====
Tứ Ân Hiếu Nghĩa ("Four Debts of Gratitude"), a Buddhist sect based in An Giang Province, is one of the most recently registered religions in Vietnam. It is based on the teachings of Ngô Lợi (1831–1890). Official government statistics report that Tứ Ân Hiếu Nghĩa claimed over 70,000 registered followers and 476 religious leaders as of 2005, centred in 76 places of worship spread across 14 provinces, mainly in Southern Vietnam. Minh Sư Đạo is a sect that is related to Cao Đài.

=== Christianity ===
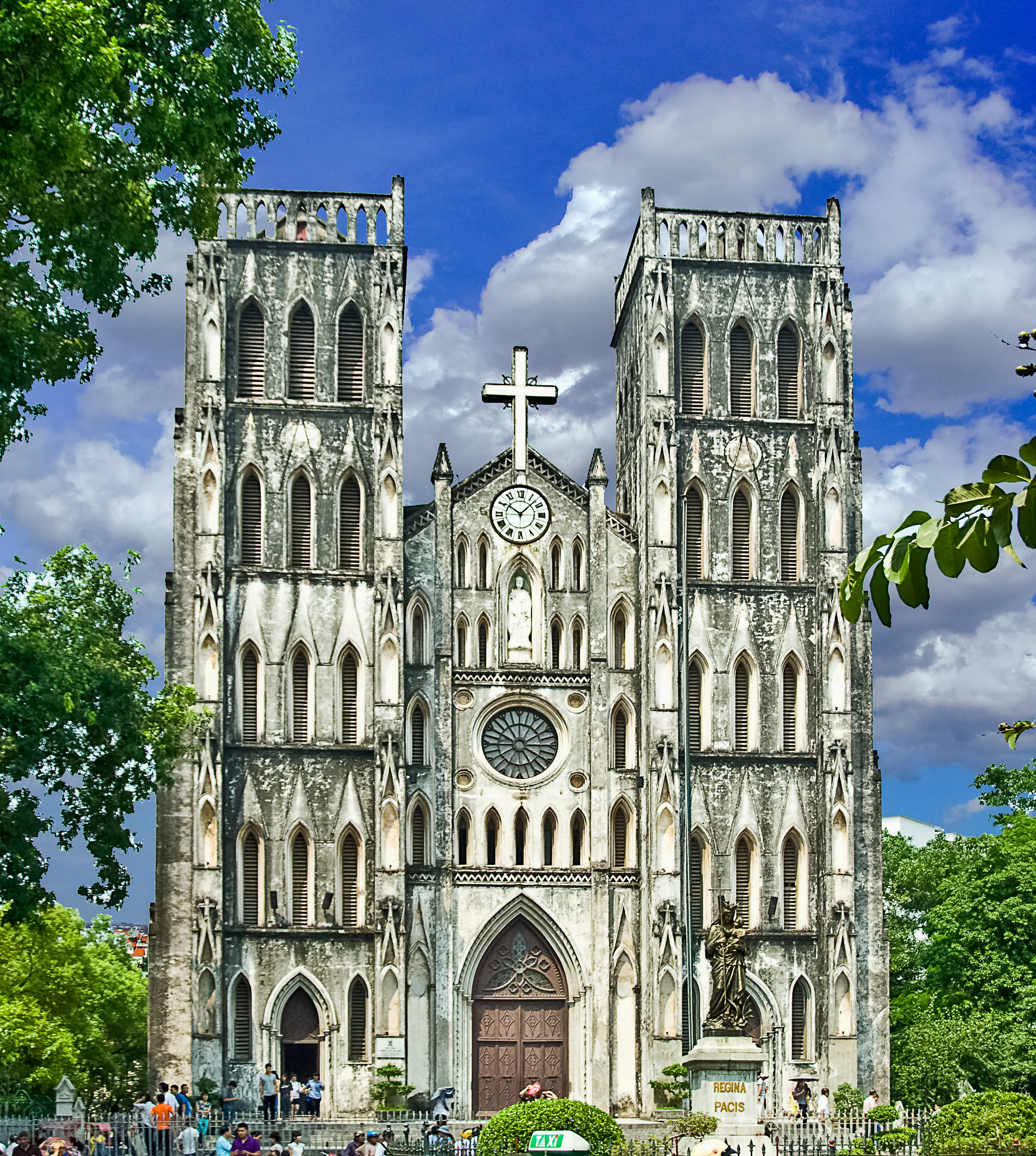
St. Joseph's Cathedral, Hanoi

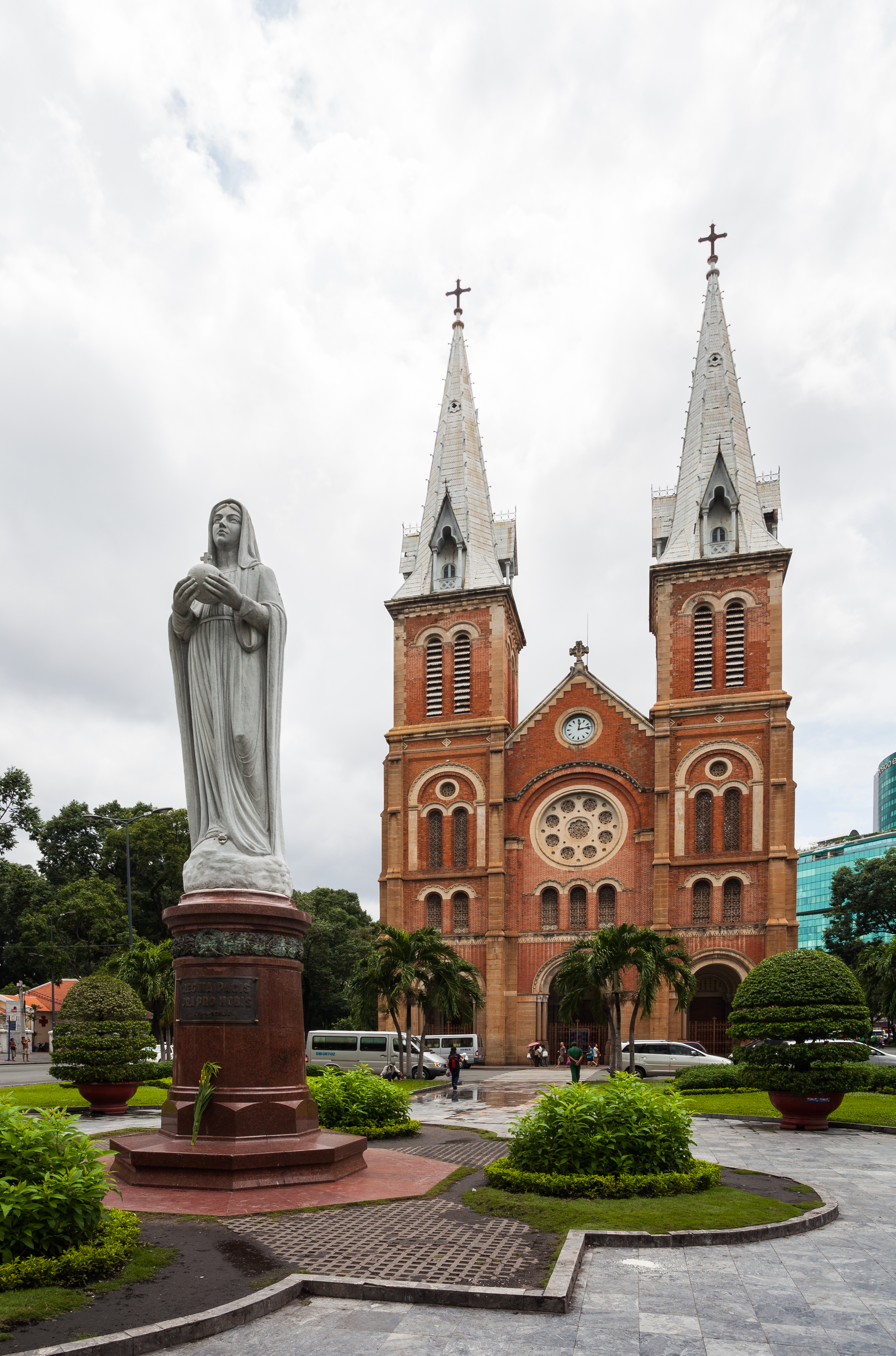
Notre-Dame Cathedral Basilica of Saigon

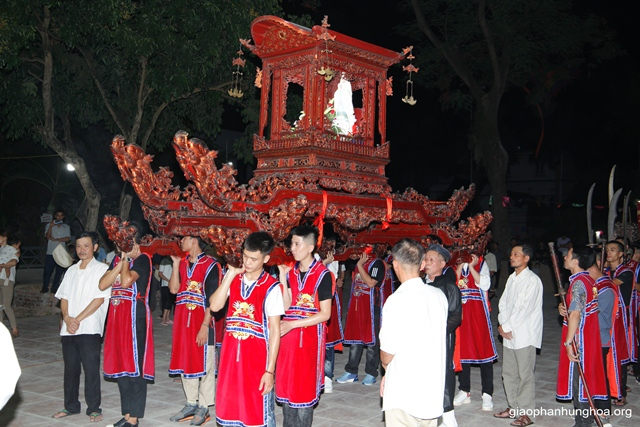
Palanquin procession to venerate Saint Mary in traditional Vietnamese style.

==== Catholicism ====
By far the most widespread Christian denomination in Vietnam, Catholicism first entered the country through Portuguese and Spanish missionaries in the 16th century, although these earliest missions did not bring very impressive results. Only after the arrival of Jesuits, who were mainly Italians, Portuguese, and Japanese, in the first decades of the 17th century did Christianity begin to establish its positions within the local populations in both domains of Đàng Ngoài (Tonkin) and Đàng Trong (Cochinchina). Two priests Francesco Buzomi and Diogo Carvalho established the first Catholic community in Hội An in 1615. Between 1627 and 1630, Avignonese Alexandre de Rhodes and Portuguese Pero Marques converted more than 6,000 people in Tonkin.

17th-century Jesuit missionaries including Francisco de Pina, Gaspar do Amaral, Antonio Barbosa, and de Rhodes developed an alphabet for the Vietnamese language, using the Latin script with added diacritic marks. This writing system continues to be used today, and is called chữ Quốc ngữ (literally "national language script"). Meanwhile, the traditional chữ Nôm, in which Girolamo Maiorica was an expert, was the main script conveying Catholic faith to Vietnamese until the late 19th century.

Since the late 17th century, French missionaries of the Foreign Missions Society and Spanish missionaries of the Dominican Order were gradually taking the role of evangelisation in Vietnam. Other missionaries active in pre-modern Vietnam were Franciscans (in Cochinchina), Italian Dominicans and Discalced Augustinians (in Eastern Tonkin), and those sent by the Propaganda Fide. During the 17th and 18th centuries, Catholicism successfully integrated into Vietnamese society and culture.

The French missionary priest Pigneau de Behaine played a role in Vietnamese history towards the end of the 18th century by befriending Nguyễn Ánh, the most senior of the ruling Nguyễn lords to have escaped the rebellion of the Tây Sơn brothers in 1777. Becoming Nguyễn Ánh's loyal confidant, benefactor and military advisor during his time of need, he was able to gain a great deal of favor for the Church. During Nguyễn Ánh's subsequent rule as Emperor Gia Long, the Catholic faith was permitted unimpeded missionary activities out of his respect to his benefactors. By the time of the Emperor's accession in 1802, Vietnam had three Catholic dioceses with 320,000 members and over 120 Vietnamese priests.

The Catholic Church in Vietnam today consists of 27 dioceses organized in three ecclesiastical provinces of Hanoi, Hue and Saigon. A government census of 2019 reported that Catholicism surpassed Buddhism to become the largest religious denomination in Vietnam, although these findings are based upon the membership of an organized religious institution rather than individual belief or practice of a religion and may reflect the lack of need or practice of membership to a religious institution, as often found in folk religion and Buddhism (see Overview, above). Ecclesiastical sources report there are about 7 million Catholics, representing 7.0% of the total population.

==== Protestantism ====
Protestantism was introduced to Da Nang in 1911 by a Canadian missionary named Robert A. Jaffray; over the years, he was followed by more than 100 missionaries, members of the Christian and Missionary Alliance, an Evangelical Protestant denomination. The two officially recognized Protestant organizations recognized by the government are the Southern Evangelical Church of Vietnam (SECV), recognized in 2001, and the smaller Evangelical Church of Vietnam North (ECVN), recognized since 1963.

Present estimates of the number of Protestants range from the official government figure of 500,000 to claims by churches of 1 million. Growth has been most pronounced among members of minority peoples (Montagnards) such as the Hmong, Ede, Jarai, and Bahnar, with internal estimates claiming two-thirds of all Protestants in Vietnam are members of ethnic minorities. By some estimates, the growth of Protestant believers in Vietnam has been as much as 600 percent over the past ten years. Some of the new converts belong to unregistered evangelical house churches, whose followers are said to total about 200,000.

Baptist and Mennonite movements were officially recognized by Hanoi in October, 2007, which was seen as a notable improvement in the level of religious freedom enjoyed by Vietnamese Protestants. Similarly, in October 2009, the Assemblies of God movement received official government permission to operate, which is the first step to becoming a legal organization.

The Assemblies of God were said to consist of around 40,000 followers in 2009, the Baptist Church around 18,400 followers with 500 ministers in 2007, and The Mennonite Church around 10,000 followers.

==== Eastern Orthodoxy ====
For Orthodox Christianity, the Russian Orthodox Church is represented in Vũng Tàu, Vietnam, mainly among the Russian-speaking employees of the Russian-Vietnamese joint venture "Vietsovpetro". The parish is named after Our Lady of Kazan icon was opened in 2002 with the blessing of the Holy Synod of the Russian Orthodox Church, which had been given in Troitse-Sergiyeva Lavra. The representatives of the foreign relations department of the Russian Orthodox Church come to Vũng Tàu from time to time to conduct the Orthodox divine service. There are also two recently organized parishes in Hanoi and Hochiminh City.

Vietnam is also mentioned as territory under the jurisdiction of the Metropolitanate of Hong Kong and Southeast Asia (Ecumenical Patriarchate of Constantinople), though there is no information on its organized activities there.

==== Jehovah's Witnesses ====
Jehovah's Witnesses established their permanent presence in Saigon in 1957. As of 2019, Jehovah's Witnesses are a target of government oppression in Vietnam.

==== The Church of Jesus Christ of Latter-day Saints ====
On May 31, 2016, leaders of the Church of Jesus Christ of Latter-day Saints (LDS Church) met with Vietnamese officials. The Government Committee for Religious Affairs officially recognized the church's representative committee. Congregations currently meet in Hanoi and Ho Chi Minh City.

=== Caodaism ===
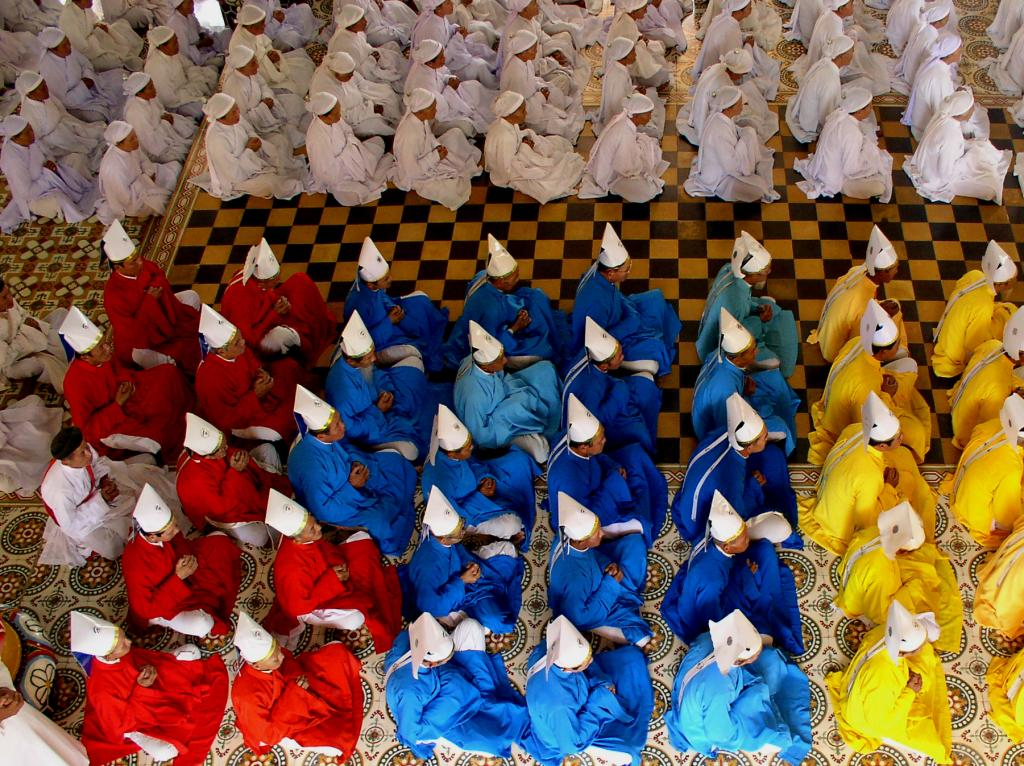
Monks praying in the Cao Đài Holy See in Tây Ninh, Vietnam.

Caodaism is a relatively new, syncretist, monotheistic religion, officially established in the city of Tây Ninh, southern Vietnam, in 1926. The term Cao Đài literally means "highest tower", or figuratively, the highest place where God reigns. Cao Đài's first disciples, Ngô Văn Chiêu, Cao Quỳnh Cư, Phạm Công Tắc and Cao Hoài Sang, claimed to have received direct communications from God, who gave them explicit instructions for establishing a new religion that would commence the Third Era of Religious Amnesty. Adherents engage in ethical practices such as prayer, veneration of ancestors, nonviolence, and vegetarianism with the minimum goal of rejoining God the Father in Heaven and the ultimate goal of freedom from the cycle of birth and death. The monotheistic syncretic religion still retains many Vietnamese folk beliefs such as ancestral worship. Official government records counted 2.2 million registered members of Tây Ninh Cao Đài in 2005, but also estimated in 2007 that there were 3.2 million Caodaists including roughly a dozen other denominations. According to the official statistics, in 2014, the estimated number of Caodaists is 4.4 million, it was a dramatic increase of 1.2 million followers or an increase of 37.5%. Country Information and Guidance — Vietnam: Religious minority groups. December 2014. Quoting United Nations' "Press Statement on the visit to the Socialist Republic of Viet Nam by the Special Rapporteur on freedom of religion or belief". It is more likely that "unofficial" Caodaists have decided that it is now acceptable to identify themselves as followers of the religion in the last seven years. Many outside sources give 4 to 6 million. Some estimates are as high as 8 million adherents in Vietnam. An additional 30,000 (numbers may vary) (primarily ethnic Vietnamese) live in the United States, Europe, and Australia.

=== Hinduism ===
Adherence to Hinduism in Vietnam is associated with the Cham ethnic minority; the first religion of the Champa kingdom was a form of Shaivite Hinduism, brought by sea from India. The Cham people erected Hindu temples (Bimong) throughout Central Vietnam, many of which are still in use today; the now-abandoned Mỹ Sơn, a UNESCO World Heritage Site, is perhaps the most well-known of Cham temple complexes.

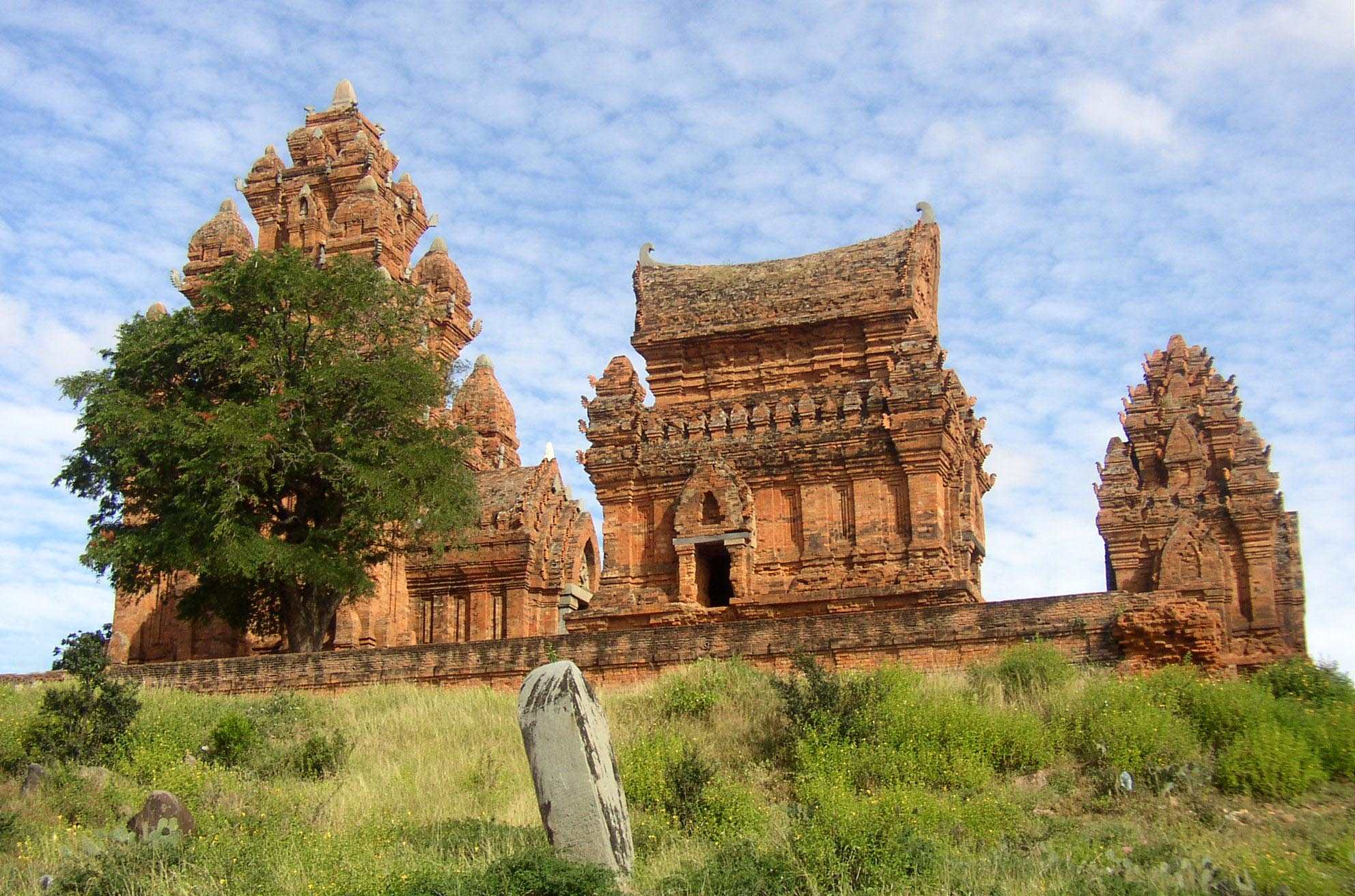
Po Klong Garai is a Hindu temple in Khánh Hòa

Approximately 50,000 ethnic Cham in the south-central coastal area practice a devotional form of Hinduism. Most of the Cham Hindus belong to the Nagavamshi Kshatriya caste, but a considerable minority are Brahmins who are recognised by the government. Another 4,000 Hindus live in Ho Chi Minh City, where the Mariamman Temple acts as a focal point for the community. In Ninh Thuận Province, where most of the Cham in Vietnam reside, Cham Balamon (Hindu Cham) numbers 32,000; out of the 22 villages in Ninh Thuận, 15 are Hindu.

As per the census of 2009, there are a total of 56,427 Cham Hindus in Vietnam. In 2022, there were an estimated 70,000 ethnic Cham living along the south-central coast.

=== Islam ===
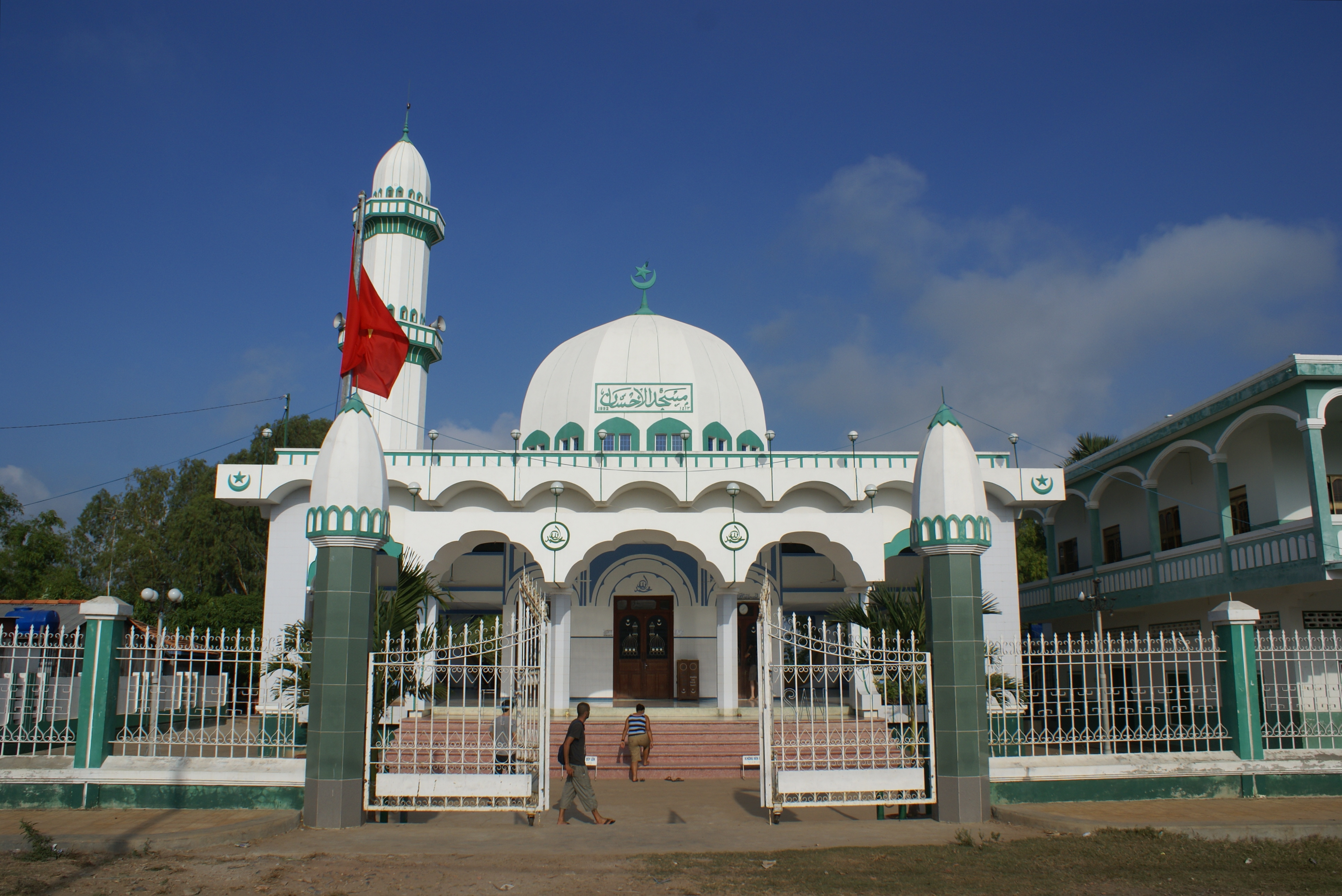
A mosque in An Giang

Much like Hinduism, adherence to Islam in Vietnam is primarily associated with the Cham ethnic minority, including those found in the southwest (Mekong Delta) of the country. Islam is presumed to have come to Vietnam much after its arrival in China during the Tang dynasty (618–907), through contact with Islamic traders. The number of followers began to increase as contacts with Sultanate of Malacca broadened in the wake of the 1471 collapse of the Champa kingdom, but Islam would not become widespread among the Cham until the mid-17th century. In the mid-19th century, many Muslim Chams emigrated from Cambodia, settling in the Mekong Delta and further bolstering the presence of Islam in Vietnam.

Vietnamese Muslims remained relatively isolated from the mainstream of the Islamic world. Their isolation, combined with the lack of religious schools, caused the practice of Islam in Vietnam to become syncretic. Although the Chams follow a localised adaptation of Islamic theology, they consider themselves Muslims. However, they pray only on Fridays and celebrate Ramadan for only three days. Circumcision is performed not physically but symbolically, with a religious leader making the gestures of circumcision with a wooden toy knife.

Vietnam's largest mosque was opened in January 2006 in Xuân Lộc, Đồng Nai Province. Its construction was partially funded by donations from Saudi Arabia.

A 2005 census counted over 66,000 Muslims in Vietnam, up from 63,000 in 1999. Over 77% lived in the Southeast, with 34% in Ninh Thuận Province, 24% in Bình Thuận Province, and 9% in Ho Chi Minh City. Another 22% lived in the Mekong Delta region, primarily in An Giang Province. In Ninh Thuận Province, where most of the Cham in Vietnam reside, Cham Bani (Muslim Cham) number close to 22,000. Out of the 22 villages in Ninh Thuận, 7 are Muslim.

The Cham in Vietnam are only recognized as a minority, and not as an indigenous people by the Vietnamese government despite being indigenous to the region. Both Hindu and Muslim Chams have experienced religious and ethnic persecution and restrictions on their faith under the current Vietnamese government, with the Vietnamese state confiscating Cham property and forbidding Cham from observing their religious beliefs. Hindu temples were turned into tourist sites against the wishes of the Cham Hindus. In 2010 and 2013, several incidents occurred in Thành Tín and Phươc Nhơn villages where Cham were murdered by Vietnamese. In 2012, Vietnamese police in Châu Giang village stormed into a Cham mosque, stole the electric generator and raped Cham girls. Cham Muslims in the Mekong Delta have also been economically marginalized and pushed into poverty by Vietnamese policies, with ethnic Vietnamese Kinh settling on majority Cham land with state support, and religious practices of minorities have been targeted for elimination by the Vietnamese government.

The evidence of Champa's influence over the disputed area in the South China Sea had brought attention to human rights violations and killings of ethnic minorities in Vietnam such as in the 2001 and 2004 uprisings, and lead to the issue of Cham autonomy being brought into the dispute, since the Vietnamese conquered the Hindu and Muslim Chams in an 1832 war and continuing to destroy evidence of Cham culture and artifacts left behind, plundering or building on top of Cham temples, building farms over them, banning Cham religious practices, and omitting references to the destroyed Cham capital of Song Luy in the 1832 invasion in history books and tourist guides. The situation of Chams compared to ethnic Vietnamese is substandard, lacking water and electricity and living in houses made out of mud.

=== Judaism ===
The first Jews to visit Vietnam likely arrived during the French protectorate period of the Nguyễn dynasty, from the latter half of the 19th century. There are a handful of references to Jewish settlement in Saigon sprinkled through the pages of the Jewish Chronicle in the 1860s and 1870s.

As late as 1939, the estimated combined population of the Jewish communities of the cities of Haiphong, Hanoi, Saigon, and Tourane numbered approximately 1,000 individuals. In 1940 the anti-Semitic Vichy-France Law on the status of Jews was implemented in Tonkin, Annam, and Cochinchina, leading to increased restrictions and widespread discrimination against Jews. The anti-Jewish laws were repealed in January 1945.

Prior to the French evacuation of Indochina in 1954, the Jewish population in the modern-day borders of Vietnam, Laos, and Cambodia was reportedly 1,500; most of these Jews were said to have left with the French, leaving behind no organized Jewish communal structure. In 1971, about 12 French Jews still remained in South Vietnam, all in Saigon. In 2005, the U.S. State Department's "International Religious Freedom Report" noted "There were no reported anti-Semitic incidents during the period covered by this report. The country's small Jewish population is composed almost entirely of expatriates and is based in Hanoi and Ho Chi Minh City".

=== Baháʼí Faith ===
Established in the 1950s, the Vietnamese Baháʼí community once claimed upwards of 200,000 followers, mainly concentrated in the South. The number of followers dwindled as a result of the banning of the practice of the Baháʼí Faith after the Vietnam War. After years of negotiation, the Baháʼí Faith was registered nationally in 2007, once again receiving full recognition as a religious community. In 2009 it was reported that the Baháʼí community has about 7,000 followers and 73 assemblies; by 2022, there were an estimated 3,000 followers in the country.

== Religious freedom ==
The Constitution of the Socialist Republic of Vietnam formally allows religious freedom, however, government restrictions remain on organized activities of many religious groups. The government maintains a prominent role overseeing officially recognized religions. Religious groups encounter the greatest restrictions when they are perceived by the government as a challenge to its rule or to the authority of the Communist party. In 2007, Viet Nam News reported that Viet Nam has six religions recognised by the State (Buddhism, Catholicism, Protestantism, Islam, Cao Đài, and Hòa Hảo), but that the Baháʼí Community of Viet Nam had been awarded a "certificate of operation" from the Government's Committee for Religious Affairs. In 2007, the Committee for Religious Affairs was reported to have granted operation registration certificates to three new religions and a religious sect in addition to six existing religions. Every citizen is declared free to follow no, one, or more religions, practice religion without violating the law, be treated equally regardless of religious belief, and to be protected from being violated in their religious freedom, but is prohibited from using religion to violate the law.

In fact, there are some limitations in religious practice in Vietnam. Foreign missionaries are not legally allowed to proselytize or perform religious activities. Preachers and religious associations are prohibited to use religion to propagate ideologies that are opposed to the government. Many Vietnamese preachers who fled for America and other countries say that they were suppressed by the Communist government for no, unreasonable or ethnic reasons; however, preachers and religious associations who abide by the law working in Vietnam today are aided and honored by the government.

The Vietnamese government has been criticized for its religious violations by the United States, the Vatican, and expatriate Vietnamese who oppose the Communist government. However, due to recent improvements in religious liberty, the United States no longer considers Vietnam a Country of Particular Concern. The Vatican has also considered negotiations with Vietnam about freedom for Vietnamese Catholics, and was able to reach a permanent agreement which would allow a permanent representative in the future to the country.

Despite some substantial attempts by the Vietnamese government to improve its international image and ease restrictions on religious freedom, the cases of dissident religious leaders' persecution has not stopped in the recent years. The general secretary of the Mennonite Church in Vietnam and religious freedom advocate Nguyen Hong Quang was arrested in 2004, and his house razed to the ground. Christian Montagnards and their house churches continue to suffer from state control and restrictions. In March, 2007, a member of the main Hanoi congregation of the legally recognized Evangelical Church of Vietnam (North) Nguyen Van Dai was arrested for accusations relating to his defense of religious freedom, including disseminating alleged "infractions" of religious liberty.

In 2023, the country was scored 1 out of 4 for religious freedom by Freedom House. In the same year it was ranked by Open Doors as the 25th most difficult place in the world to be a Christian.

== See also ==
- Freedom of religion in Vietnam
- Vietnamese philosophy
- Taoism in Vietnam
- Vietnamese Confucianism
- Vietnamese folk religion
- Baháʼí Faith in Vietnam
- Buddhism in Vietnam
- Hinduism in Vietnam
- Islam in Vietnam
- Judaism in Vietnam
- Caodaism
- Hòa Hảo
- Christianity in Vietnam
  - Catholic Church in Vietnam
  - Orthodoxy in Vietnam
  - Protestantism in Vietnam
- Category:Vietnamese Confucianists
