= Taoism in Vietnam =

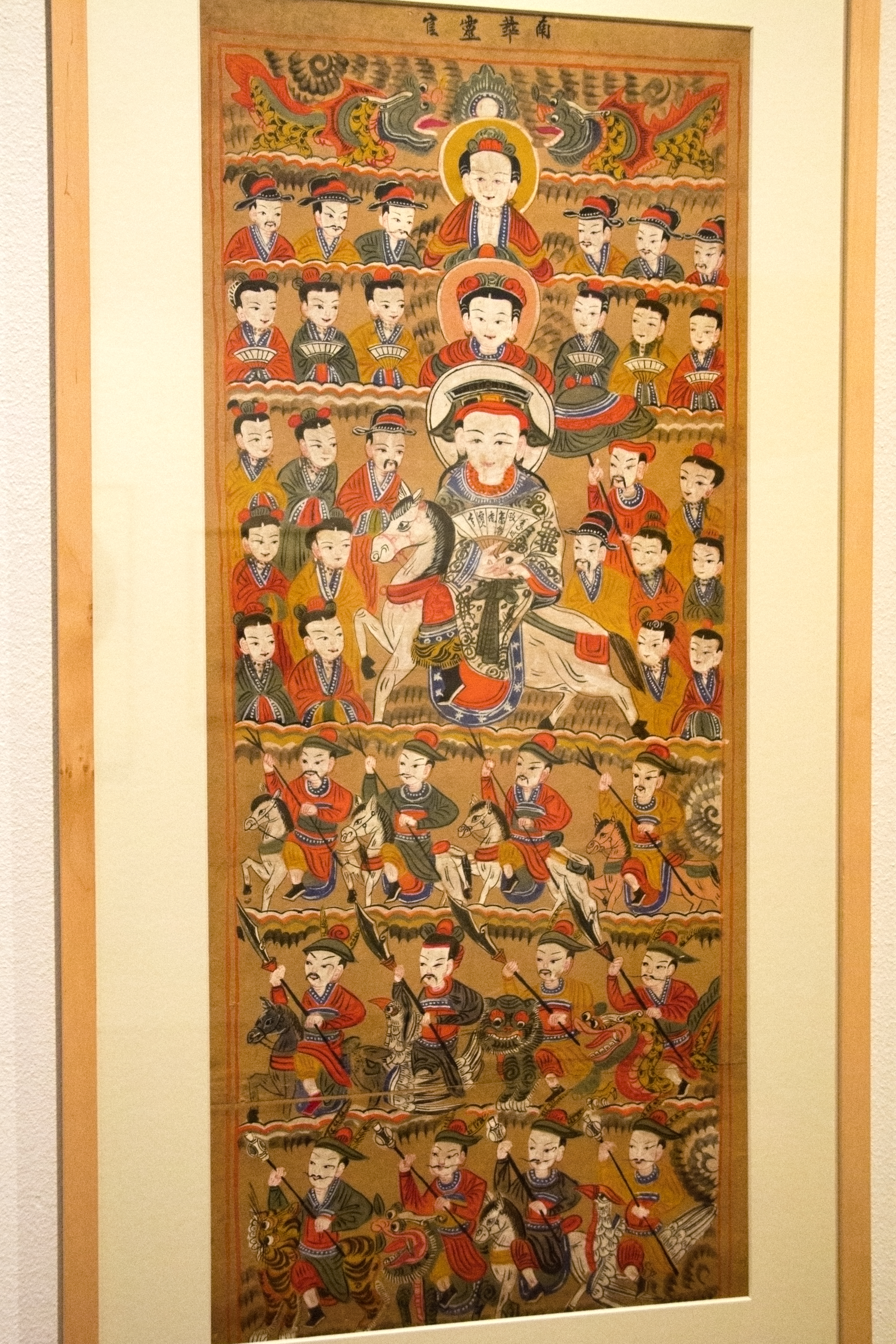
Vietnamese paintings depicting Taoist gods, Northern Vietnam, 1945

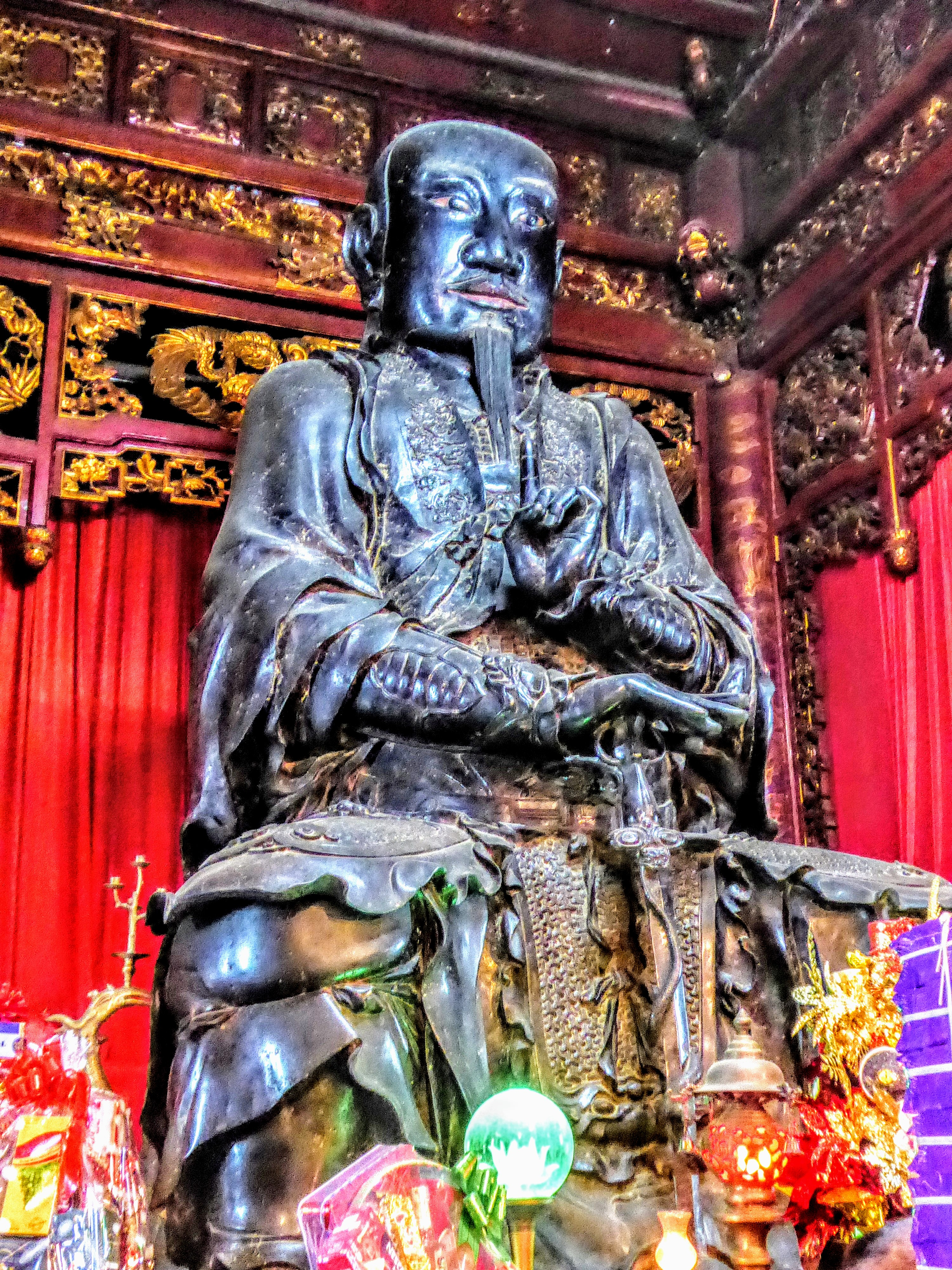
Statue of god Trấn Vũ (Xuanwu) in Quán Thánh Temple

Taoism in Vietnam (Vietnamese: Đạo giáo Việt Nam) is believed to have been introduced into the country during the first Chinese domination of Vietnam. Despite a strong national identity against Chinese rule throughout the centuries, the early Vietnamese were said to have embraced Taoism very early on as they had already worshipped a variety of spirits and readily embraced the exorcistic sorcerous practices brought by the Taoist.

Under the Lý dynasty Emperor Lý Nhân Tông (1072-1127), the examination for the recruitment of officials consisted of essays on the "three doctrines - Tam Giáo/三教” (Confucianism, Buddhism, and Taoism).

Taoism in its pure form is rarely practiced in Vietnam, but elements of it have been absorbed into the Vietnamese folk religion and fragments of it are still practiced in areas with small Chinese communities. One of these small communities is Khanh Van Nam Vien Temple, which is a temple owned by Cantonese Quanzhen Taoists in Saigon. Fujianese Taoists also inhabit smaller rural villages in the west such as Châu Đốc where the local spirit medium rituals belong to the Lu Shan Sect. Other than these small Chinese communities, most other descendants of the Taoist religion in Vietnam are not as organized as they would be in places with larger Chinese communities and therefore have been turned into nothing more than shamans also known as thầy pháp. Thầy pháp are said to specialize in different types of sorcery. Depending on who and which regions of Vietnam they inhabit, the shaman may be more Taoist based or may also have Cambodian, Thai, or Vietnamese folk magic influences, especially near the borders of the Mekong Delta where it is close to Cambodia. However, a handful of Vietnamese have traveled on pilgrimages to Taoist monasteries in China and have been bringing it back to Vietnam. These monasteries mainly being the QuanZhen and Zheng Yi sects are different from the folk Taoist traditions in Vietnam.

Taoism has also influenced the Caodaism and shamanic beliefs of Đạo Mẫu in Vietnam.

According to Professor Liam Kelley during the Tang dynasty native spirits were subsumed into Daoism and the Daoist view of these spirits completely replaced the original native tales. Buddhism and Daoist replaced native narratives surrounding Mount Yên Tử (安子山).

Additionally, Cuong T. Mai has shown how the Song Daoist refugee-priest Xu Zongdao transformed the local White Crane Earth Magistrate spirit (Bạch Hạc Thổ Lệnh) into a state-protecting deity in the fourteenth-century, as evidenced in a bell inscription from Thông Thánh Abbey. The inscription shows how Daoist rituals were embedded within Trần elite culture, thereby serving to sacralize Đại Việt’s landscape and provide Daoist salvation to the dead.

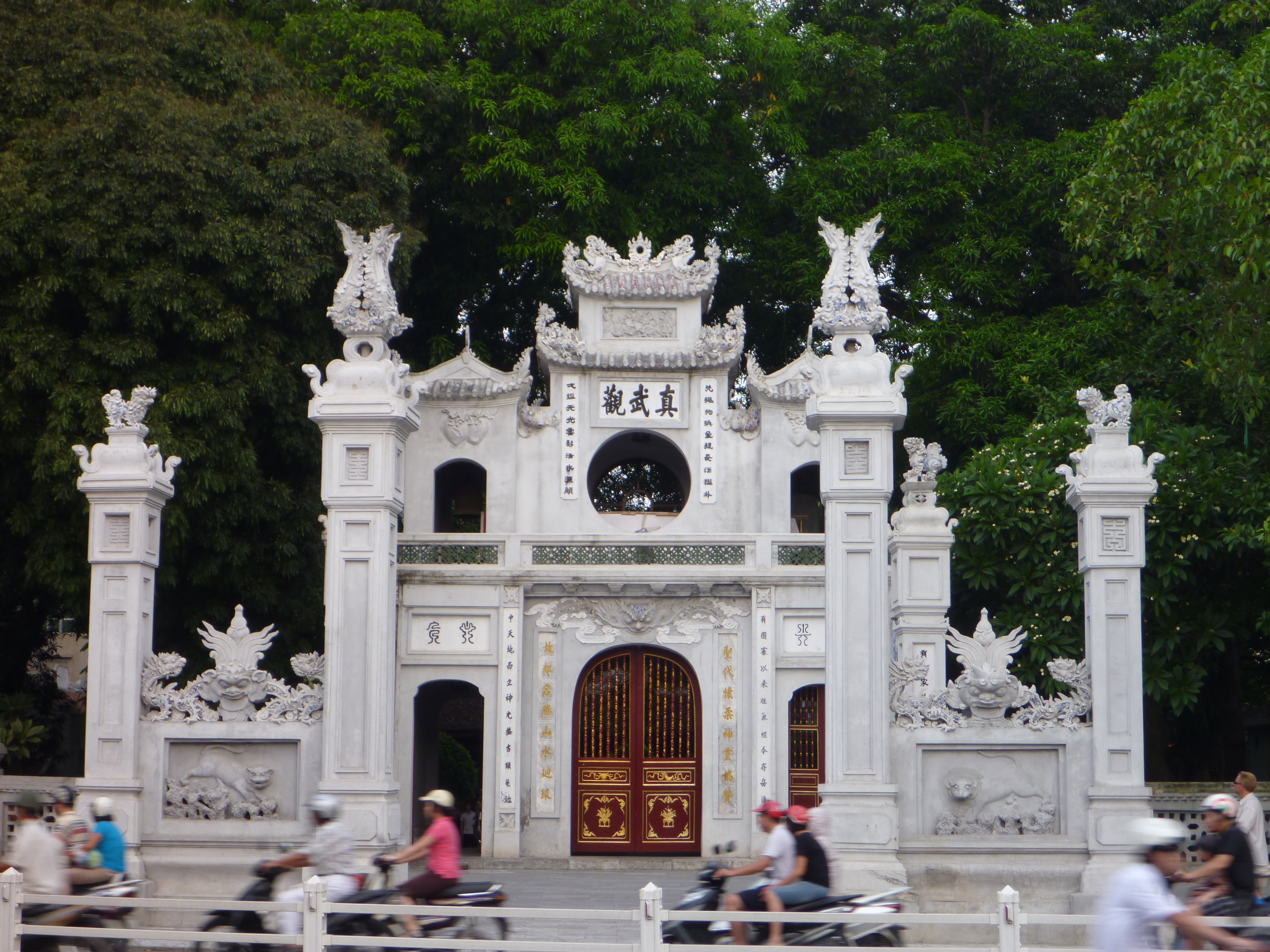
Gateway of the Quán Thánh Temple.

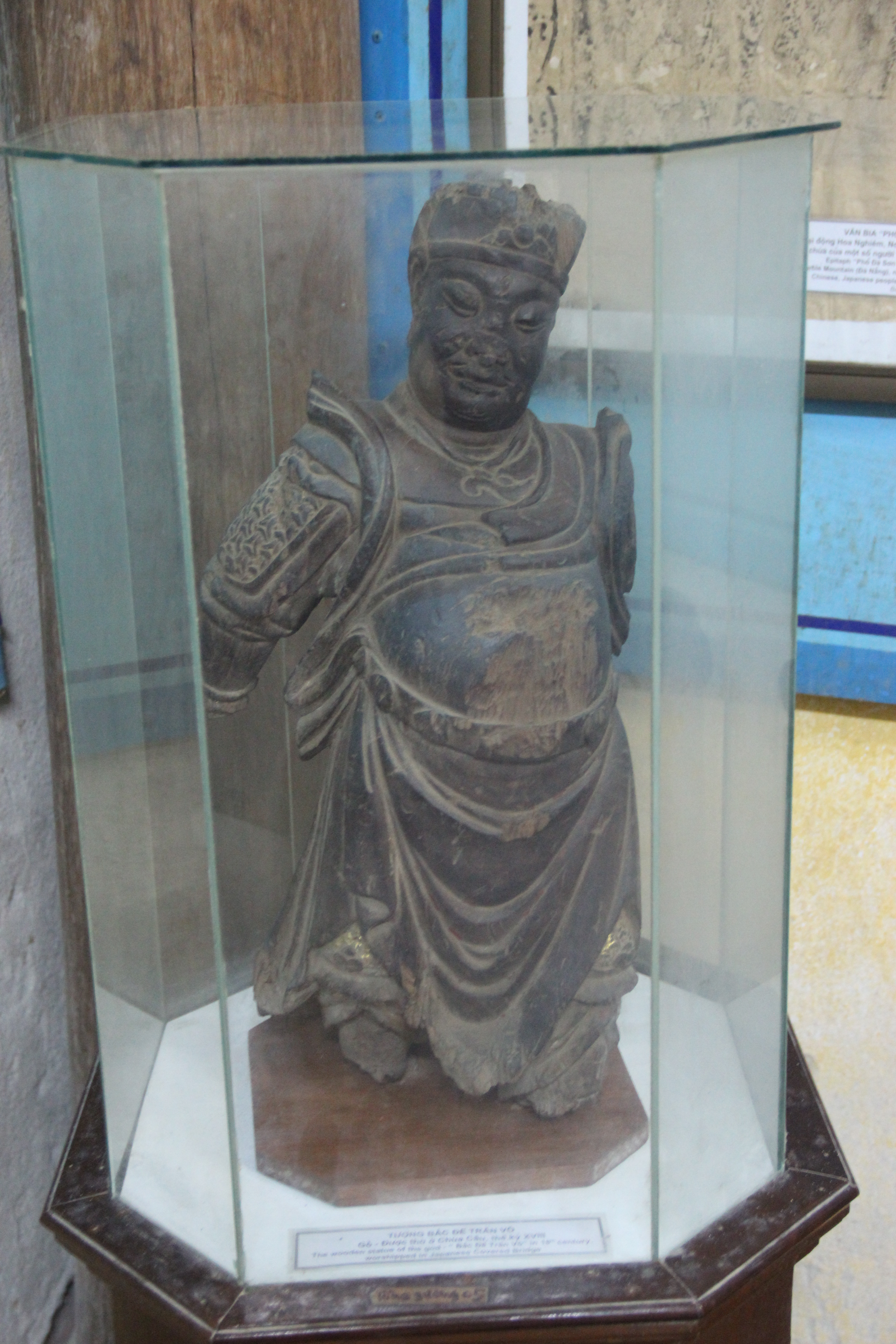
Statue of god Bắc Đế Trấn Võ (Xuanwu) in Hoian.

== See also ==
- Chinese ancestral worship
- Chinese folk religion in Southeast Asia
- Chinese ritual mastery traditions
- Quán Thánh Temple
- Religion in Vietnam
- Temple of the Jade Mountain
- Thành hoàng
- Three teachings
