= Eastern Orthodoxy in Vietnam =

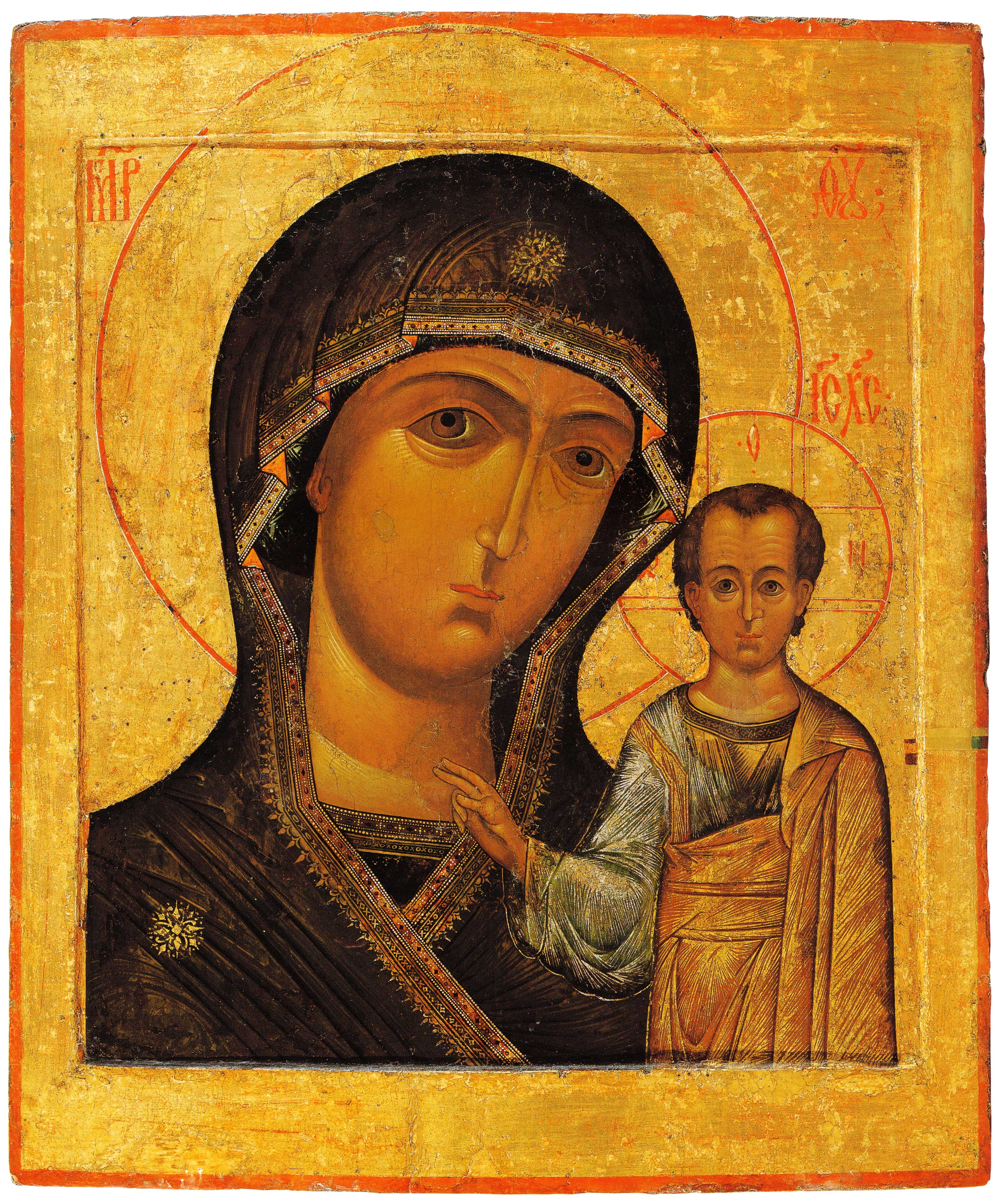
Our Lady of Kazan icon

Eastern Orthodoxy in Vietnam is represented by 4 parishes of the Russian Orthodox Church in Vung Tau, Hanoi, Ho Chi Minh City, and Nha Trang.

The earliest parish in Vung Tau was opened in 2002 with the blessing of the Holy Synod of the Russian Orthodox Church, which had been given in Troitse-Sergiyeva Lavra.

== Russian Orthodox Church in Vietnam ==
The Chairman of Russian Orthodox Church's Department for External Church Relations Metropolitan Kirill (since 2009 Patriarch of Moscow and All Rus) was the first Russian Orthodox hierarch to visit Vietnam in November 2001. Headed by Kirill, the delegation had meetings with the Russian speaking community and Vietnamese officials, and held church services in Hanoi, Ho Chi Minh City and Vung Tau (about 600 people were present).

Since that time representatives of Russian Orthodox Church come to Vung Tau from time to time to conduct the Eastern Orthodox divine service.

In 2007, the mission of the Russian Orthodox Church organized Easter divine services in Vung Tau, General Consulate of Russia in Ho Chi Minh City and the Russian Center of science and culture in Hanoi.

In April 2010, the delegation of the foreign relations department of the Russian Orthodox Church organized and conducted regular Easter services in Our Lady of Kazan icon parish in Vungtau.

The Russian Patriarchal Exarchate in South-East Asia was established on December 28, 2018, by the Holy Synod of the Russian Orthodox Church. Included in jurisdiction of that Exarchate, the new Diocese of the Philippines and Vietnam contains 4 parishes in Vietnam:

- Parish of Our Lady of Kazan in Vung Tau (established in 2002)
- Parish of Saint Xenia of Petersburg in Hanoi (established in 2019)
- Parish of Protection of Our Most Holy Lady Theotokos and Ever-Virgin Mary in Ho Chi Minh City (established in 2019)
- Parish of Saint Nicholas the Wonderworker in Nha Trang (established in 2024)

Metropolitan of Khanty-Mansiysk and Surgut Paul (Pavel Fokin) is governing hierarch of the Philippinian-Vietnamese eparchy (as of February 2020).

== Other Eastern Orthodox churches ==
Vietnam is also mentioned as a territory under the jurisdiction of the Orthodox Metropolitanate of Hong Kong and Southeast Asia (Ecumenical Patriarchate of Constantinople), though there is no information on its organized activities there.

== Notable peoples ==
- Đặng Văn Lâm, thegoalkeeper for V.League 1 club Ninh Bình and the Vietnam national football team.

== See also ==
- Religion in Vietnam
- Christianity in Vietnam
