= Dispatch News Service =

American news agency

- Type: News agency
- Industry: Underground press
- Founded: 1968; 58 years ago in Manila, Philippines
- Founders: Michael Morrow, Dan Derby, Emerson Manawis, and Richard Hughes
- Defunct: 1973; 53 years ago
- Fate: Defunct
- Headquarters: Washington, D.C.
- Key people: John Steinbeck IV, John Everingham, Sean Flynn, Don Luce, Gareth Porter, Jonathan Unger
- Products: News bulletins, photographs

Dispatch News Service International (DNSI) was an alternative news agency that operated from 1968 to 1973. Initially focusing on in-depth reporting on the Vietnam War, DNS as it was commonly known, established its main operations in Saigon, South Vietnam. Reporters traveled extensively throughout Southeast Asia, reporting from various capitals, but its focus remained the countries of Cambodia, Laos, and Thailand.

Among the reporting distributed by DNS was Seymour Hersh's My Lai massacre story. For his exclusive disclosure of the Vietnam War tragedy at the hamlet of My Lai, Hersh, as well as DNS, received the Pulitzer Prize for International Reporting in 1970.

Contributors to DNSI included John Steinbeck IV, John Everingham, Sean Flynn, Don Luce, Thomas C. Fox, Steve Erhart, Crystal Erhart, Gareth Porter, J. L. Rivera, Christopher Beck, Jonathan Unger, Michael Berger, D. E. Ronk, Boris Baczynskj, David Boggett and many others.

The Washington, D.C., office was managed and directed by Dick Berliner, followed by Desmond McAllister, then David Obst, and later Joe Gatins.

== History ==
DNS was founded in 1968 by young journalists Michael Morrow, Dan Derby, Emerson Manawis, and actor Richard Hughes. The affiliated Dispatch News Service International was incorporated in Manila, Philippines in 1968; the incorporators were Morrow, Emerson Manawis, Mariano D. Manawis, Josefina A. Manawis, and Emilie A. Manawis.

The agency was forced to close in 1973 when it "failed to find adequate financial support for [its] operations."

== Bureaus ==
=== International ===
DNS had bureaus and/or representative offices in the following countries with its respective manager or representative:

- Taipei, Taiwan — Christine Lin
- Vientiane, Laos — Crystal Eastin
- Sydney, Australia — Richard Anderson, James Falk and Peter Viola
- Hong Kong — Jacques Leslie
- Macau — Stephen Thomas
- Bangkok, Thailand — Frank Sommerville

=== Domestic ===
In the United States, DNS had bureaus and/or representative offices in the following cities:

- San Francisco — Tom Donaldson and Kitty Wynn
- Los Angeles — Steven Nichols, Sally Benson and Lynn Shavelson
- Boston — John Thompson
- New York City — Richard Greenbaum
- Seattle — Peter Morrow
