= Coconut Religion =

Syncretistic religion founded by Nguyễn Thành Nam in 1963

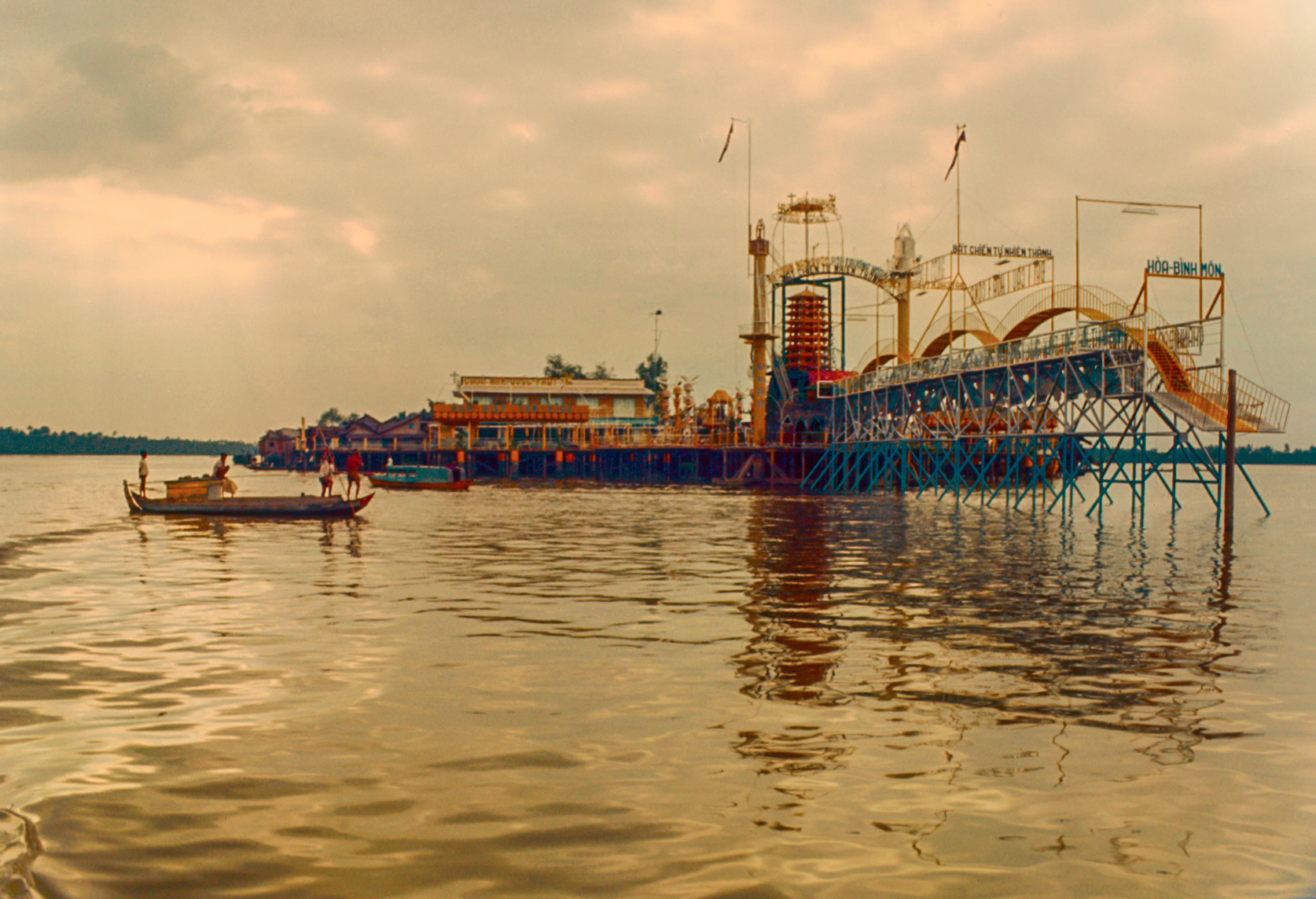
The floating temple of the Coconut Religion, photographed in 1969

The Coconut Religion (Vietnamese: Đạo Dừa) is a religion founded by Ông Đạo Dừa in Bến Tre, South Vietnam. It was one of many religions in the South until the new socialist government abolished it in 1975. Đạo Dừa advocated religious harmony, synthesizing many religions, especially Buddhism and Christianity. The Coconut Religion is not currently recognized as a religion by the Government of Vietnam.

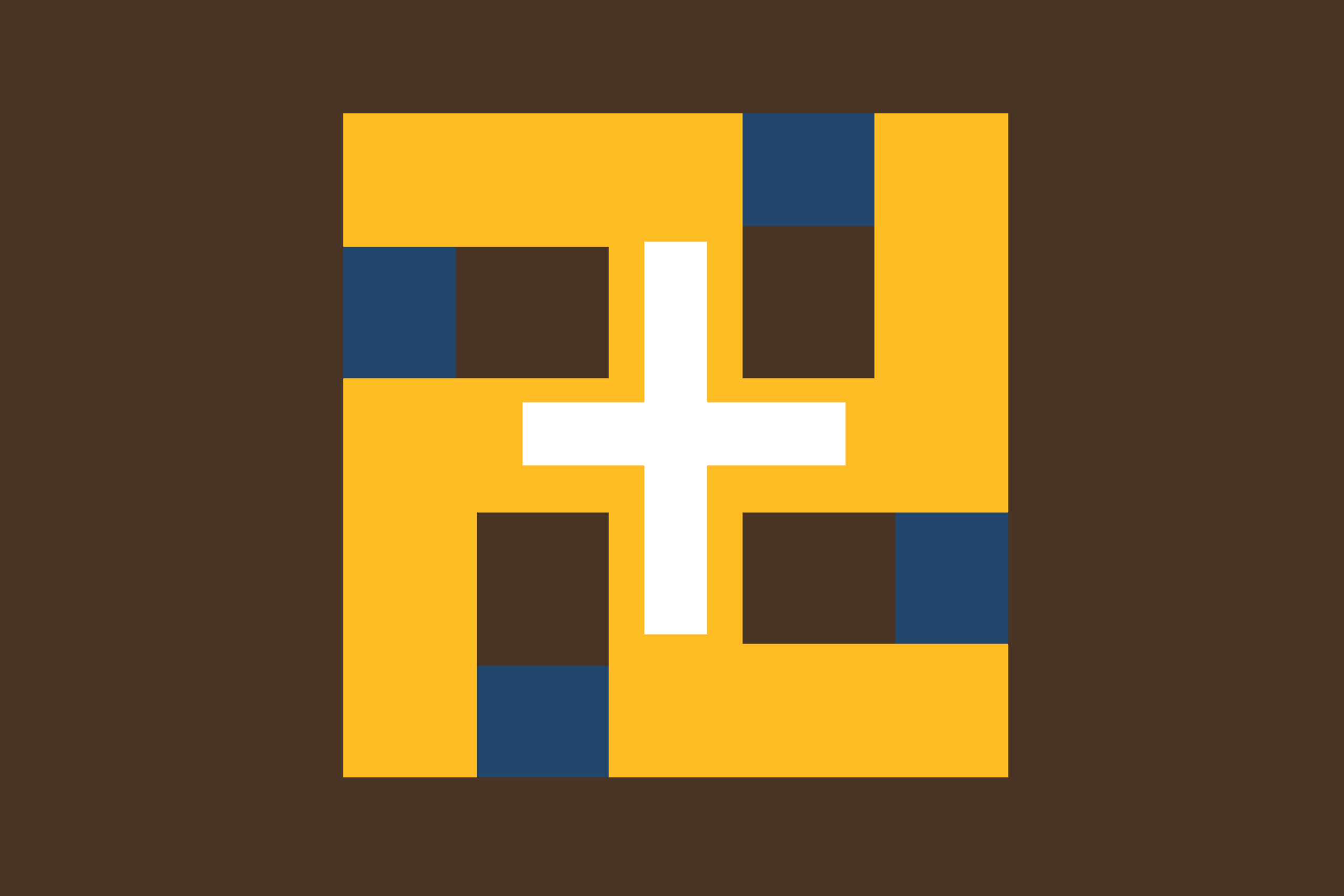
Flag of the Coconut Religion

== History ==
The Coconut Religion was founded in 1963 by Vietnamese mystic and scholar Nguyễn Thành Nam, also known as the Coconut Monk, His Coconutship, Prophet of Concord, and Uncle Hai (1909 – 1990). Nam, who attended a French university, established a floating pagoda in the southern Vietnamese "Coconut Kingdom", in the province of Bến Tre. It is alleged that Nam consumed only coconuts for three years; for that period he also practiced meditation on a small pavement made from stone. Nam was a candidate for the 1971 South Vietnamese presidential election but he would drop out after being afraid that he would be arrested and returned to his "Coconut Kingdom". Despite his eccentric behaviour, the government of Saigon respected him and called Nam a "man of religion". He usually sported a crucifix around his neck and dressed in traditional Buddhist robes.

Estimates of followers of the religion worldwide were 4,000 at its highest. One notable follower was John Steinbeck IV, the son of American novelist John Steinbeck. The religion was deemed a "cult" and was promptly banned in 1975 by communist officials.

The Coconut Monk died in unexplained circumstances in 1990, marking the demise of the cult. The Coconut Estate is now a tourist attraction along the My Tho Mekong Delta Tour.

== See also ==
- Religion in Vietnam
