= Ông Đạo Dừa =

Founder of the Coconut Religion

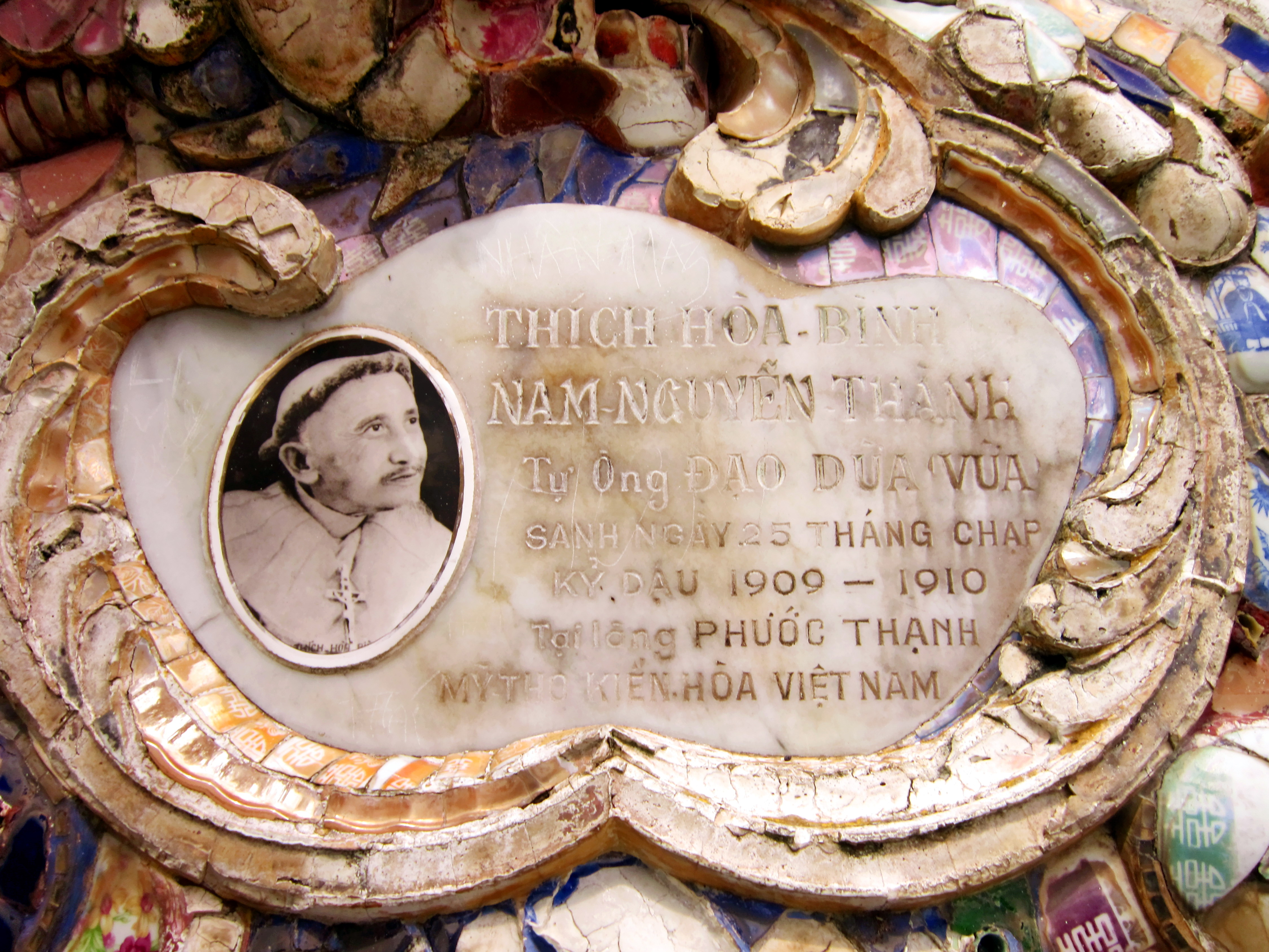
A marble slab with a brief inscription of Ông Đạo Dừa's name

Ông Đạo Dừa ("The Coconut Monk"), born Nguyễn Thành Nam (December 25, 1910 – May 13, 1990), was a self-styled Vietnamese mystic and the founder of the Coconut Religion (Đạo Dừa) in Vietnam.

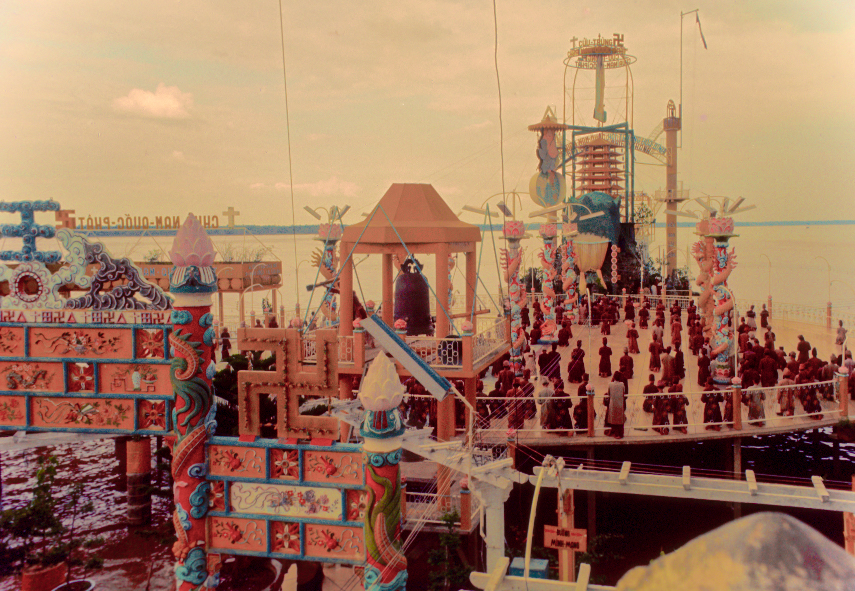
Đạo Dừa temple in Bến Tre.

== Family and early life ==
Born on 25 December 1910 as Nguyễn Thành Nam, he was born in a village in Truc Giang district, Kien Hoa province. He was the son of a rich family, whose father named Nguyễn Thành Trúc was a chief of the region and had a mother named Lê Thị Sen. In 1928, he went to Rouen, France, to study for seven years. When he graduated as a chemical engineer in 1935, he returned to his hometown. He proceeded to marry a woman named Lộ Thị Nga, and have a daughter named Nguyễn Thị Khiêm, though in his later life would marry eight more wives. When he returned at his hometown, he faced constant trouble with the local French authorities due to not working for the country. In response to this, he climbed onto a coconut palm to sit there motionless. People who were interested in him or believed in him went to see him. He was forcefully taken down from the coconut tree by the authorities, he fell but he climbed onto another tree. The authorities left him alone afterwards. While still sitting, he wrote on a paper to preach saying “Nothing, but the number of disciples numbered thousands, they covered him around the outside.”

Following 1945, he left to A Son Pagoda in Bảy Núi to take refuge for three years, with his body only having skin and bones. When the formation of the State of Vietnam occurred under the leadership of former Emperor Bảo Đại, he returned to Định Tường province (now Tiền Giang) to establish a pagoda to practice religion publicly. Practicing the beliefs such as Christianity and Zen Buddhism, while worshipping both God and Buddha. He starved himself without eating or drinking. In 1950, he returned to Phuoc Thanh to build a Bagua platform 14 meters high. Nam's source of food would be consuming fruits though mainly coconuts. He'd bath once a year on Buddha's Birthday. In 1958, he sent a letter to President Ngô Đình Diệm protesting his policies regarding Buddhists. He was arrested but then released.

== Later years ==
In 1963, he established his ashram on Phoenix Island in Bến Tre province and founded the Coconut Religion. He was a candidate for the 1971 South Vietnamese presidential election. It is alleged that Nam consumed only coconuts for three years, for that period he also organized mass meditations and praying for the ending of the Vietnam War on a floating platform. Despite his eccentric behaviour, the government of Saigon respected him and called Nam a "man of religion". He usually sported a crucifix around his neck and dressed in traditional Buddhist robes.

After the 1975 Communist takeover of the South, his religion was deemed a cult and he was imprisoned for 10 years. He died on 13 May 1990 after a clash with the communist authority.
