= Quán Thánh Temple =

- Đền Quán Thánh
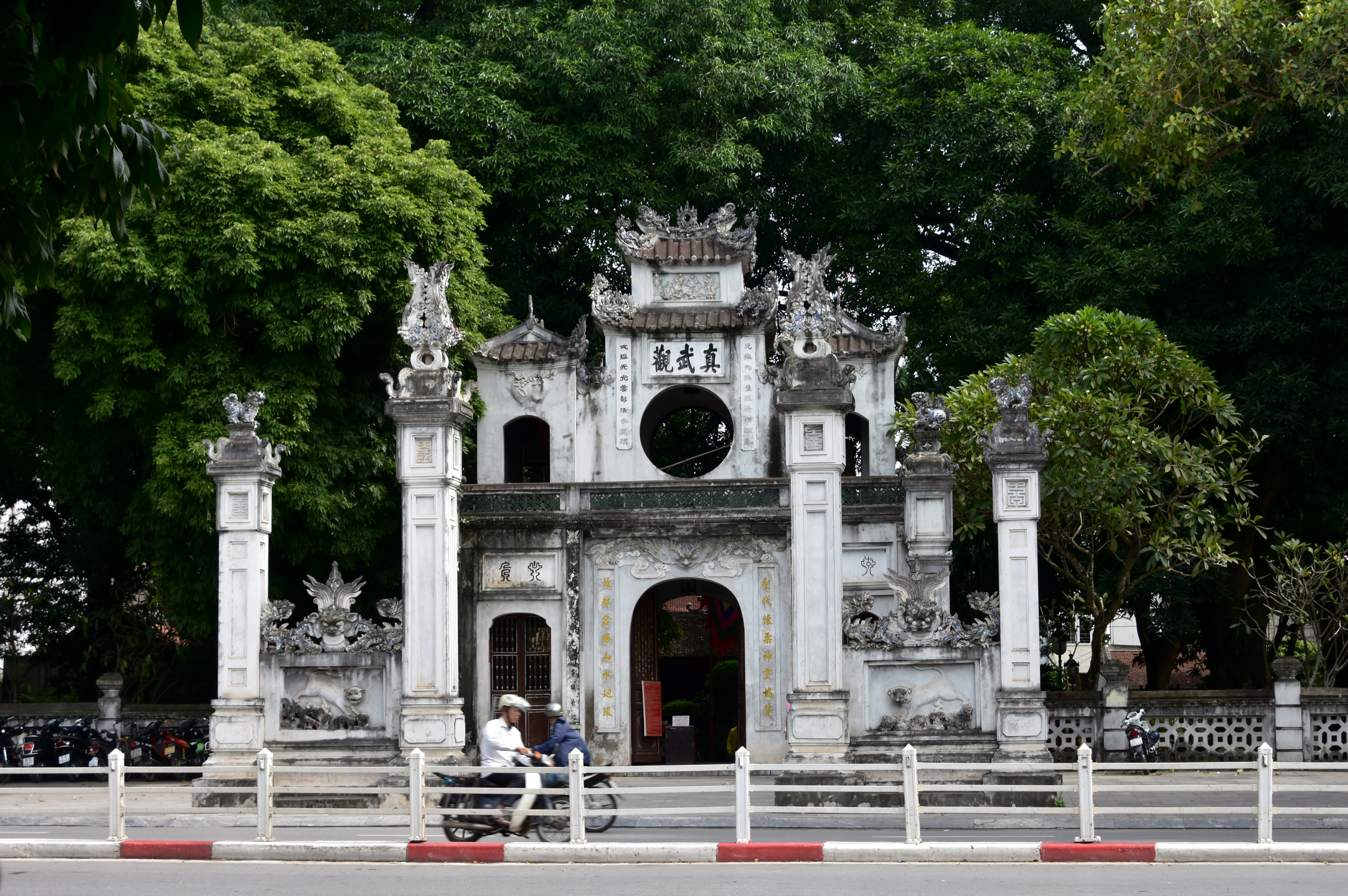
- Principal gate of Quán Thánh Temple
- Interactive map of the Quán Thánh Temple area
- Former names: Đền Trấn Vũ (Trấn Vũ Temple) then Đền Quan Thánh (Quan Thánh Temple)

General information
- Type: Taoist temple
- Location: Hanoi, Vietnam
- Coordinates: 21.043113°N 105.836508°E
- Construction started: 11th century

Quán Thánh Temple (Vietnamese: Đền Quán Thánh), also known as Trấn Vũ Temple (Sino-Vietnamese: Chân Vũ Quán, chữ Hán: 真武觀), is a Taoist temple in Hanoi, Vietnam. Dated to the 11th century, the temple was dedicated to Xuan Wu, or Trấn Vũ (chữ Hán: 鎮武) in Vietnamese, one of the principal deities in Taoism. As one of the Four Sacred Temples of the capital, Quan Thánh Temple is located near West Lake in a ward of the same name: Quán Thánh Ward; and is one of the leading tourist attractions in Hanoi. The temple's name means Place (alternatively shop/restaurant) of the Gods. The name of the long street running by the temple is also called 'Quán Thánh' street.

== History ==
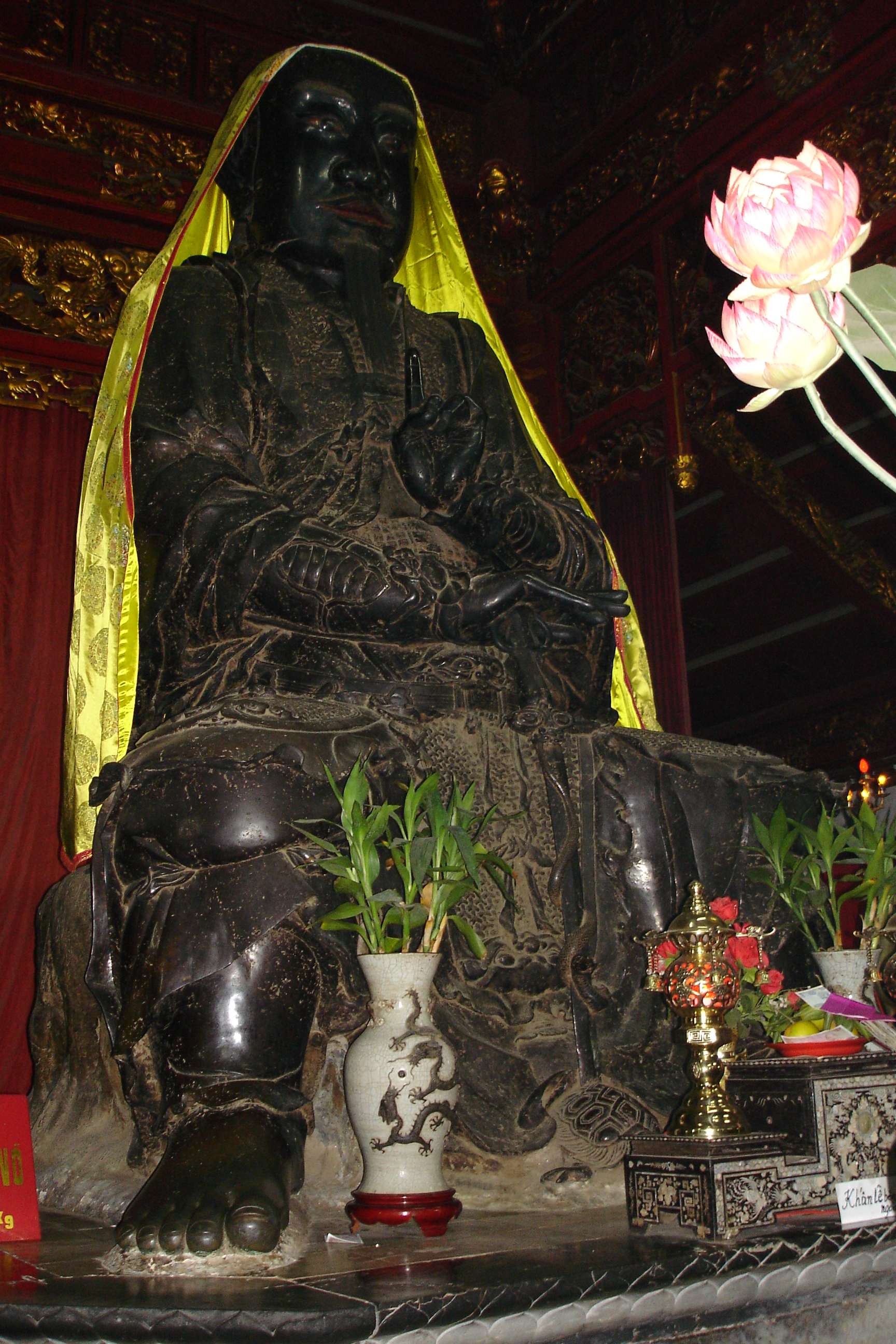
Trấn Vũ bronze statue in main shrine of the temple.

Legend has it that Quán Thánh Temple was established during the reign of Emperor Lý Thái Tổ (reigned 1010–1028) and was dedicated to Trấn Vũ, Deity of the North in Taoism, whose symbols of power are the serpent and turtle (see section on Animal Symbolism below). It is one of the Four Sacred Temples that were built in four directions to protect the capital from malevolent spirits. Quán Thánh protects from the North, while the other three temples protect from the other directions: Bạch Mã from the East, Kim Liên from the South, and Voi Phục from the West. In Hanoi, there is also a second Trấn Vũ Temple in the Gia Lâm District. Though smaller than Quán Thánh Temple, this smaller temple is also dedicated to Trấn Vũ with a 9-tonne statue of the deity.

Nowadays, after many geographical changes to the city layout, Quán Thánh Temple is located on the corner of Quán Thánh Street and Thanh Niên Street, facing West Lake. It is a short walk from Trúc Bạch Lake where pilot (and future United States senator) John McCain was shot down in October 1967.

== Architecture ==
During its long history, Quán Thánh Temple has been renovated several times, most recently in 1893 when the principal gate and the shrine were redone, so the architecture is a mixture of the many different styles of the imperial era. The main features of Quán Thánh Temple are a large yard shaded by a giant banyan tree and a shrine that contains the famous bronze statue of Trấn Vũ.

In 1677, during the reign of Emperor Lê Huy Tông, artisans from the nearby village of Ngũ Xã offered Quán Thánh Temple a very large statue of Trấn Vũ in black bronze, which remains today. This statue is measured 3.96 metres (13.0 ft) in height, weighs around 3,600 kilograms (7,900 lb) and depicts Trấn Vũ as a deity with his two symbolic animals, the serpent and the turtle. Considered a masterpiece of Vietnamese bronze casting and sculpture, it is the second biggest bronze statue in Vietnam. This artwork is evidence of the advanced technical standard of bronze casting and sculpture of Vietnamese artisans in the 17th century. Cast at the same time as Trấn Vũ's statue was a 1.15 metres (3.8 ft) bronze bell. Those were creations of a master craftsman named Trùm Trọng, who had his own statue in Quán Thánh Temple placed alongside the Trấn Vũ statue. Beside the statues of Trấn Vũ and Trùm Trọng, the main shrine also has a valuable collection of ancient texts such as poems or duilians which date from the 17th and 18th century. After each restoration, a stele was often kept in the temple for the record; the oldest one dated from 1677 while the latest was made by viceroy Hoàng Cao Khải in 1894 during the reign of Thành Thái Emperor during the French colonial era.

The temple currently has writing in Literary Chinese, due to the adoption of Literary Chinese after Vietnamese independence from China. During the 17th century, Portuguese missionaries began to write the Vietnamese language using the Latin alphabet. In the early 20th century, Vietnam officially adopted the Latin alphabet for their writing. Nowadays only a few Vietnamese can read and understand the ancient Chinese characters.

== Animal Symbolism ==
In most Vietnamese temples, there is a great deal of animal symbolism, and Quán Thánh is no exception. The most famous example of animal symbolism is the image of the serpent and the turtle. The serpent represents wealth and the turtle represents protection. In a traditional Vietnamese fairy tale, the turtle had a powerful sword that made its way to Lê Thái Tổ and allowed the Vietnamese win the war against the Chinese.

Another important animal is the crane, which is included in a famous Vietnamese story with the turtle. The story says that there once was a drought and the turtle needed water to stay alive. The crane saw he was in trouble, and flew him to the nearest water source. Later there was a flood and the crane had no place to land, so the turtle let the crane stand on his back until the flood was over. This story shows symbiosis, or friendship. This is shown by how the two animals helped each other when they were in trouble.

== Activities ==
In the courtyard there is a brick oven where people burn joss papers. The joss papers is typically burned during Tết (Lunar New Year). This is because it is believed that the money and other items will be sent to their ancestors. According to a guide of the temple, the origin of this tradition is still unknown.

By tradition, Hanoians often come to Quán Thánh Temple on the occasion of Tết or the first and fifteenth of each lunar month (new and full moon respectively) to worship and pray for health, luck and happiness.

Taoism has been mixed with other Vietnamese religions since this temple was built, so the people that come to pray are not fully Taoist. Currently two monks live at the temple.

With its history and architecture, Quán Thánh Temple is one of the tourist attractions in Hanoi. It is also a training venue for several traditional martial art classes including Vovinam.

== Images ==
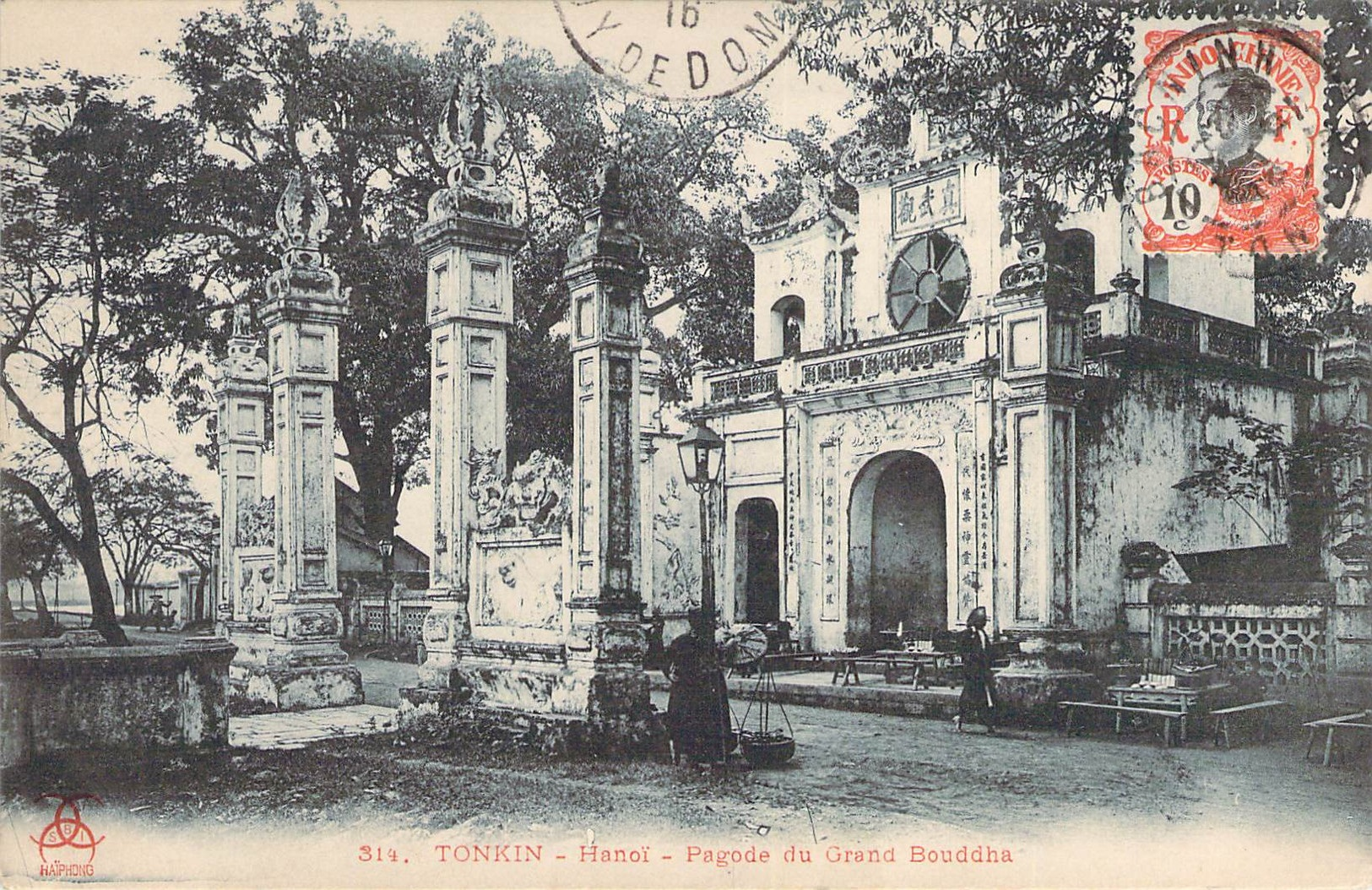
Quán Thánh Temple in the early 20th century, as depicted in a French postcard in which it was erroneously called "Pagoda of the Big Buddha"

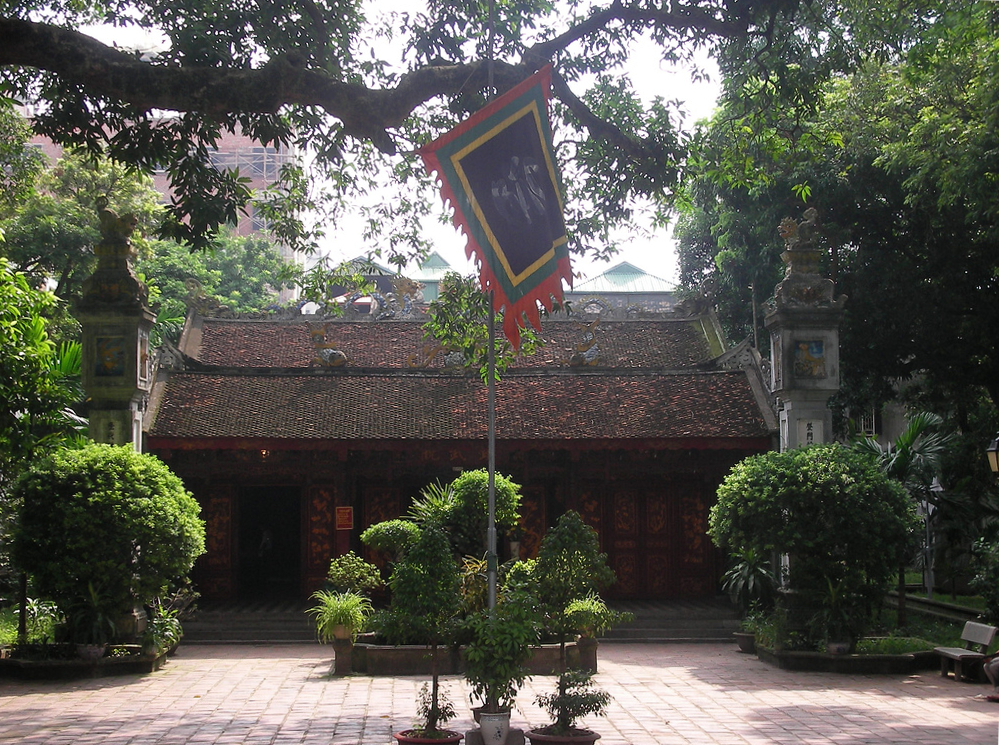
Large courtyard in the temple

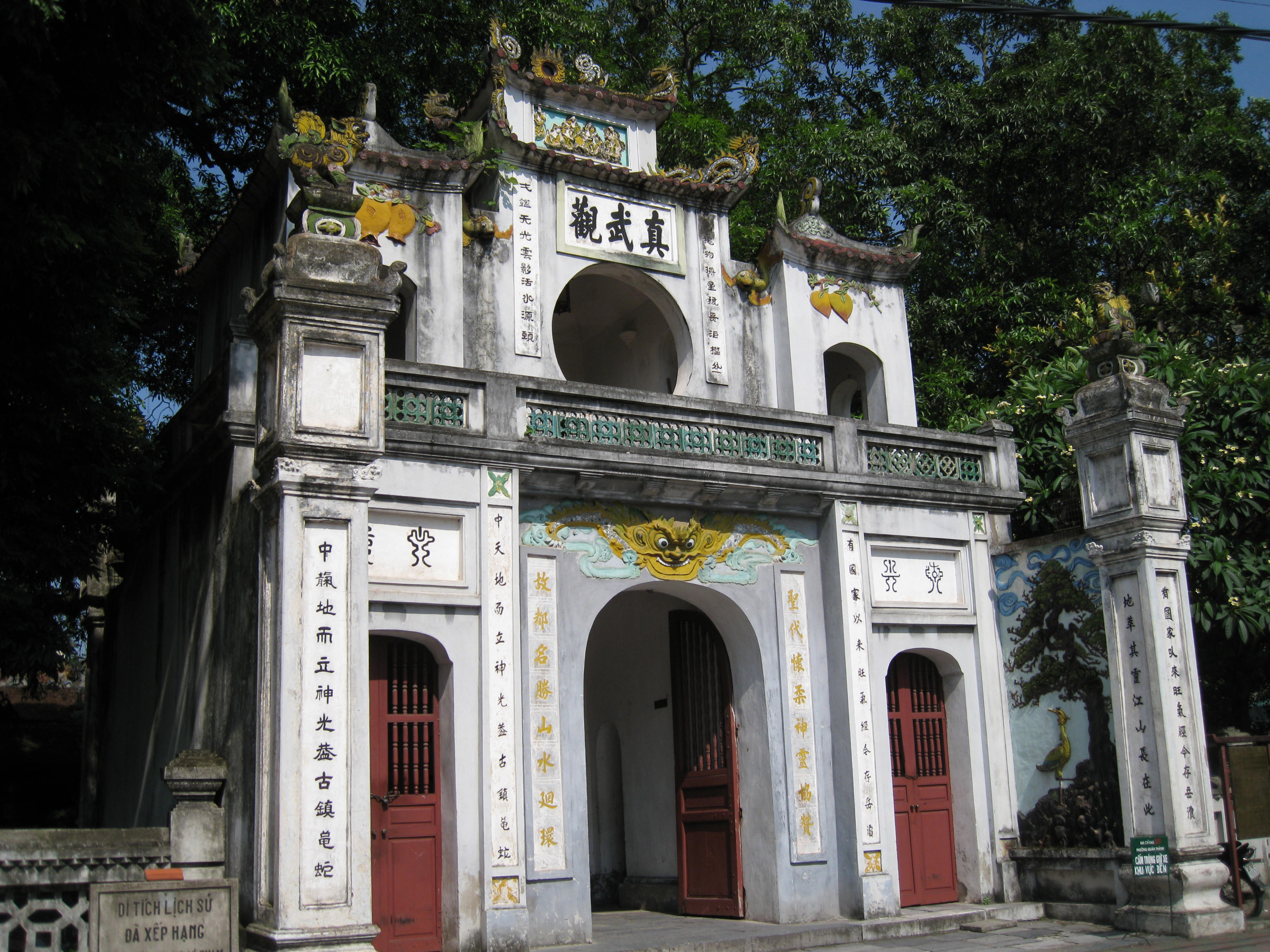
Close-up of the Nghi môn with its chữ Hán antithetical couplet
