= Vietnamese mythology =

Vietnamese mythology (Vietnamese: Thần thoại Việt Nam) comprises folklore, national myths, legends, or fairy tales from the Vietnamese people with aspects of folk religion in Vietnam. Vietnamese folklore and oral traditions may have also been influenced by historical contact with neighbouring Tai-speaking populations, other Austroasiatic-speaking peoples, as well as with people from the region now known as Greater China.

== Myth of national origin ==
The mythology of the ethnic Vietnamese people (the Việt,) has been transferred through oral traditions and in writing. The story of Lạc Long Quân and Âu Cơ has been cited as the common creation myth of the Vietnamese people. The story details how two progenitors, the man known as the Lạc Long Quân and the woman known as the Âu Cơ, gave birth to a "hundred eggs, fifty of which hatched, settled on land and eventually became the Vietnamese people".

However, the story, dubbed Con rồng cháu tiên ("Descendants of the Dragon and the Immortal"), is labeled as a truyền thuyết ("legend"), a "type of folkloric tale about historical characters and events, usually embellished with fantastical elements," and is more akin to other fantastical legends, such as the story of Lê Lợi discovering a mythical sword from a magical turtle.

Đại Việt sử ký toàn thư (Complete Annals of Đại Việt) proposed more details on the origins of the two progenitors, for example on how Lạc Long Quân was the son of Kinh Dương Vương, who was in turn descended from the Viêm Đế or Yan Emperor/Thần Nông or Shennong.

Additionally, Ngô Sĩ Liên, the author of the text, cited elements from Lĩnh Nam chích quái. Thần Nông and their descendants leading to Kinh Dương Vương, Lạc Long Quân and Âu Cơ, and even commented on the potential familial bond between this couple (Lạc's father Kinh Dương Vương and Âu's grandfather Đế Nghi were brothers, both of Thần Nông descent).

== Creation myths ==
=== Thần Trụ Trời ===
The myth of Thần Trụ Trời tells that when the world was just a dark and chaotic area, a god with extraordinary appearance and strength appeared. God raised his head to the sky, dug the earth himself, and smashed rocks to form a pillar to support the sky. The work went on like this, and soon heaven and earth were divided. When the sky was high and dry, the god broke the pillars and threw rocks and stones everywhere, turning them into mountains, islands, high hills, and wide seas. So today, the ground is not flat.

== Popular heroes and gods ==
Figures in Vietnamese mythology include The Four Immortals: the giant boy Thánh Gióng, mountain god Tản Viên Sơn Thánh, Chử Đồng Tử marsh boy, princess Liễu Hạnh.

One of the Four Immortals also reemerges in the fighting between Sơn Tinh and Thủy Tinh ("the god of the mountain and the god of the Water"). Historical legend occurs in the story of the Thuận Thiên ("Heaven's Will") magical sword of Emperor Lê Lợi.

Folk mythology includes figures such as the mười hai bà mụ "Twelve Midwives", twelve goddesses who teach one-month-old babies skills such as sucking and smiling.

== Mythological beings and creatures ==
Vietnamese mythology includes a wide range of supernatural beings associated with natural forces and religious practice. Dragons ("rồng") are among the most omnipotent and omnipresent figures and are generally seen as benevolent beings linked to water, rainfall, and kingship. This is a contrast to western ideas of dragons linked to fire and conflict. They also play a central role in origin myths, particularly through the figure of Lạc Long Quân.

Other mythological beings include shape-shifting spirits such as the "hồ ly tinh" (fox spirit). They are depicted as helpful or as tricksters. They are believed to have the ability to cultivate, transform, and have magic. In the founding myth, Lạc Long Quân kills a fox spirit to prevent harm to the people.

== Popular myths, legends and stories ==
A list of some popular fairy tales or Vietnamese myths and legends includes but is not limited to:

- Lạc Long Quân and Âu Cơ (The Vietnamese creation origin myth)
- The legend of Sơn Tinh and Thủy Tinh (Mountain God and Water God)
- The betrayal of An Dương Vương
- Hoàn Kiếm Lake – Lê Lợi and the Magical Sword
- Ông Táo – the Kitchen Gods
- The origins of bánh chưng - the story of Lang Liêu
- Four Elements – the Turtle, the Dragon, the Unicorn and the Phoenix

== King of the gods ==
The king of the gods in Vietnamese mythology is Ông Trời ("God of heaven"), then due to the influence of China, he was identified with Jade Emperor so he was also called Ngọc Hoàng Thượng Đế, commonly referred to as Ngọc Hoàng.

== Etiology and landscape ==
Vietnamese mythology is closely connected to the physical landscape with many stories serving to explain geographical features and environmental conditions.

The legend of Sơn Tinh and Thủy Tinh is commonly interpreted as a symbolic representation of the struggle against seasonal flooding in the Red River Delta.

The story of Hoàn Kiếm Lake links a specific location in Hanoi to divine intervention and royal legitimacy.

The landscape of Hạ Long Bay is explained through a well known myth in which a family of dragons descends from heaven to defend Vietnam from invaders. The story of them scattering jewels for defense transformed into the bay's limestone islands.

== Themes and cultural significance ==
Vietnamese mythology functions as a device for the teaching of moral values, societal norms, and the nation's collective identity. Many narratives emphasize virtues such as filial piety, loyalty, living with nature, and respect for hierarchy, reflecting both indigenous traditions and later Confucian influence.

Myths frequently serve etiological purposes, explaining natural phenomena and environmental patterns. The legend of Sơn Tinh and Thủy Tinh is widely interpreted as a cultural reflection of recurring flooding in the Red River delta.

Origin myths such as that of Lạc Long Quân and Âu Cơ reinforce shared ancestry among the Vietnamese people while symbolically expressing the relationship between lowland and highland populations. This also reinforces national identity.

== Influences and syncretism ==
Vietnamese mythology reflects a long process of cultural interaction and syncretism, combining indigenous Austroasiatic beliefs with external influences, from China in particular due to imperial influence. Early traditions emphasize the themes and virtues of animism, ancestor worship, and the veneration of natural spirits associated with mountains, rivers, and other features of the landscape.

Chinese intellectualism and religious systems like Confucianism, Taoism, and Buddhism were incorporated into Vietnamese mythology. The figure of the Jade Emperor (Ngọc Hoàng) is derived from Taoist belief but was then integrated into local religious practice.

== See also ==
East Asia

- Chinese creation myths, Chinese mythology
- Japanese creation myth, Japanese mythology
- Korean creation narratives, Korean mythology

Southeast Asia/East Asia

- Tai-speakers: Zhuang people, Tày people, Nung people, Dai people, etc.
- Austroasiatic-speakers: Muong people, Thổ people, etc.
