= Whale worship =

Religious practice

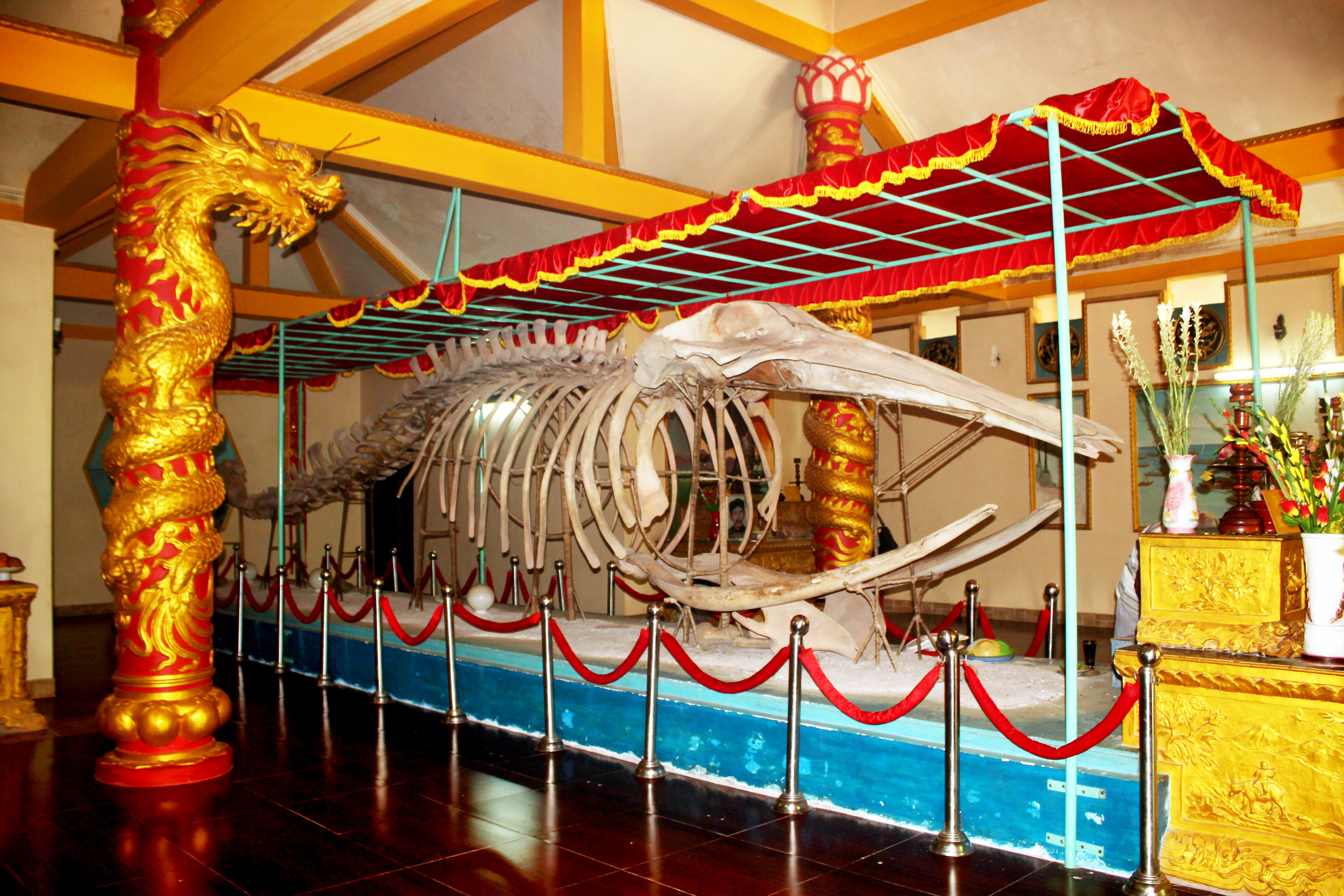
A whale skeleton in Nam Hai Temple, Hon Da Bac, Khánh Bình Tây commune, Trần Văn Thời district, Cà Mau province

Several Eastern folk religions practice in the worship of whales. This practice is common in Vietnamese folk religion, where it is known as Cá Ông. In Vietnamese religion, whales are believed to be guardian angels that protect fishermen. Beached whales are buried and given funerals, and festivals are held in honor of whales.

In Japanese mythology, the water deity Ebisu is associated with whales, and Ainu mythology features several cetacean deities. Whales have also played important roles in Korean, Chinese, and Māori mythology.

== History ==
=== Vietnam ===
The origin of Vietnam's whale worship remains unknown. Some people are believed that it came from the tradition of Cham people and Khmer people, who introduced it in the area in the 4th and 10th century. The ritual was also believed to have its origin in a Buddhist legend, the story told that after witnessing the plight of poor fisherman was caught inside the storms in South Sea, Avalokitesvara Bodhisattva tore her cassock into many pieces and turned them into the whale to help the fisherman. She noticed that the whale could not withstand the power of the tempest, the Avalokiteshvara gathered elephant bones from the forest and the whale received it, which made the whale strong enough to overthrow the storm and save the man. After this, Vietnamese people gave it the name "cá voi" (literally means "elephant fish") or "cá Ông", which means "Grandfather fish".

=== Japan ===
In medieval times, Ebisu's ancestry was linked to that of "Hiruko", the first child of Izanagi and Izanami, born without bones (or, in some legends, arms and legs) due to his mother's transgression throughout the marriage rite. Hiruko managed to survive, but because he could not stand, he was thrown into the sea in a reed boat before his third birthday. According to the legend, Hiruko washed ashore—possibly in Ezo (蝦夷; ancient Hokkaidō)—and was cared for by the Ainu Ebisu Saburo (戎三郎). However, it is thought that Ebisu began as a god of fishermen, and that his transformation into Hiruko came far later, after his religion had extended to merchants and farmers. It is also possible that he was born as "Kotoshironushi no Mikoto", the son of Ōkuninushi. He became one of the shichifukujin or the seven gods of fortune, which include Daikokuten, Bishamonten, Benzaiten, Fukurokuju, Jurojin, and Hotei. Ebisu, together with Daikokuten, was considered the most popular of these seven and was venerated in almost every Japanese home. In certain cultures, Ebisu is often synonymous with artifacts that can float ashore from the sea, such as logs and even bodies, in addition to being a god of fishing, prosperity, and fortune. Ebisu was also connected with marine megafauna such as whales and whale sharks (hence the latter's name "Ebisu-Shark") that carry in large amounts of fish and shield fishermen as a form of animal worship.

Ainu mythology contains cetacean-shaped deities such as Rep-un-riri-kata-inao-uk-kamuy (レプンリリカナイナウウクカムイ), the primal ocean deity and the chief of whales, and orca-shaped deities such as Rep-un-kamuy, and Rep-un-sokki-koro-kamuy (レプンソッキコロカムイ).

=== Korea ===
Whale worship among Korean Peninsula include ocean deities that bring fish and protection and save people from misfortunes, tutelary deities of the land and nation that can be also wrathful to cause violent waves and winds to defeat foreign enemies. For instance, Munmu of Silla left a will that he will reincarnate as either a Whale God or Dragon God to protect the nation. However, various Korean folk religions were merged with Buddhism which arrived as early as late 4th Century. Whale worship was also adopted and the greater part of the beliefs was later merged with dragon worship. Promotion of Confucianism since 15th Century resulted in decline of Buddhism including whale worship, and remnants of whale worship can be seen today such as whale-shaped instruments.

=== China ===
In many Chinese cultures, whales were treated as mystical beings and were called "Ocean Chief" and "Sea Dragon King". Fishermen especially along Bohai Sea and East China Sea regarded whales as deities that bring fish and protections. Fishermen considered whale sightings as good omens; when whales appeared, all vessels made ways for the whales to pass, and people burned paper money which were to offer to gods, and threw rice into the sea as offering.

=== Polynesia ===
Whales played important roles in Māori mythology such as Paikea the Whale Rider, and whales appeared as incarnations of ocean deities and tribal guardians including Tangaroa and Taniwha.

== Features of Vietnamese Cá Ông worship ==
=== Objects of worship ===
In Vietnamese folk religion, Vietnamese people believe that all living things have a spirit and that mountain and sea gods really exist. For thousands of years, coastal cultures have revered the sea genie and other water genies to show their gratitude for nature and hope for a happy and prosperous life. All along Vietnam's 3,200 kilometres (2,000 mi) coastline, fishing cultures worship giant whales, whom they regard as their guardian angels, a religious practice that scholars believe is unique to the region. Whale worship is recognized as an important cultural heritage of Vietnam. The temples of worshiping whale have also been built across the country.

=== Beliefs and acts ===
Vietnamese fishermen believe that whale genies are still watching over them, saving them from the perils of the sea and aiding them in meeting their obstacles. Locals sometimes tell tales of a whale genie warning them of impending disaster in a dream. Whales sometimes find a secure place to shelter ahead of hurricanes or monsoons, such as under a ship or ferry. Locals say that the whales assist them in balancing their boat through floods or high winds. The whales are considered good luck charms by them.

When a dead whale washes up on shore, it was customary for the villagers to hold a funeral. Dead whales, large and tiny, were formerly buried in the "holy land". However, because of the dense population and to prevent pollution, whales larger than 3 meters are now buried near the beach, away from populated areas. Their bones are excavated and preserved above ground after being buried for five or ten years. Whale oil is separated and preserved in large ceramic pots to be used for the annual washing of the whale bones on the anniversary of their death.

=== Festivals ===
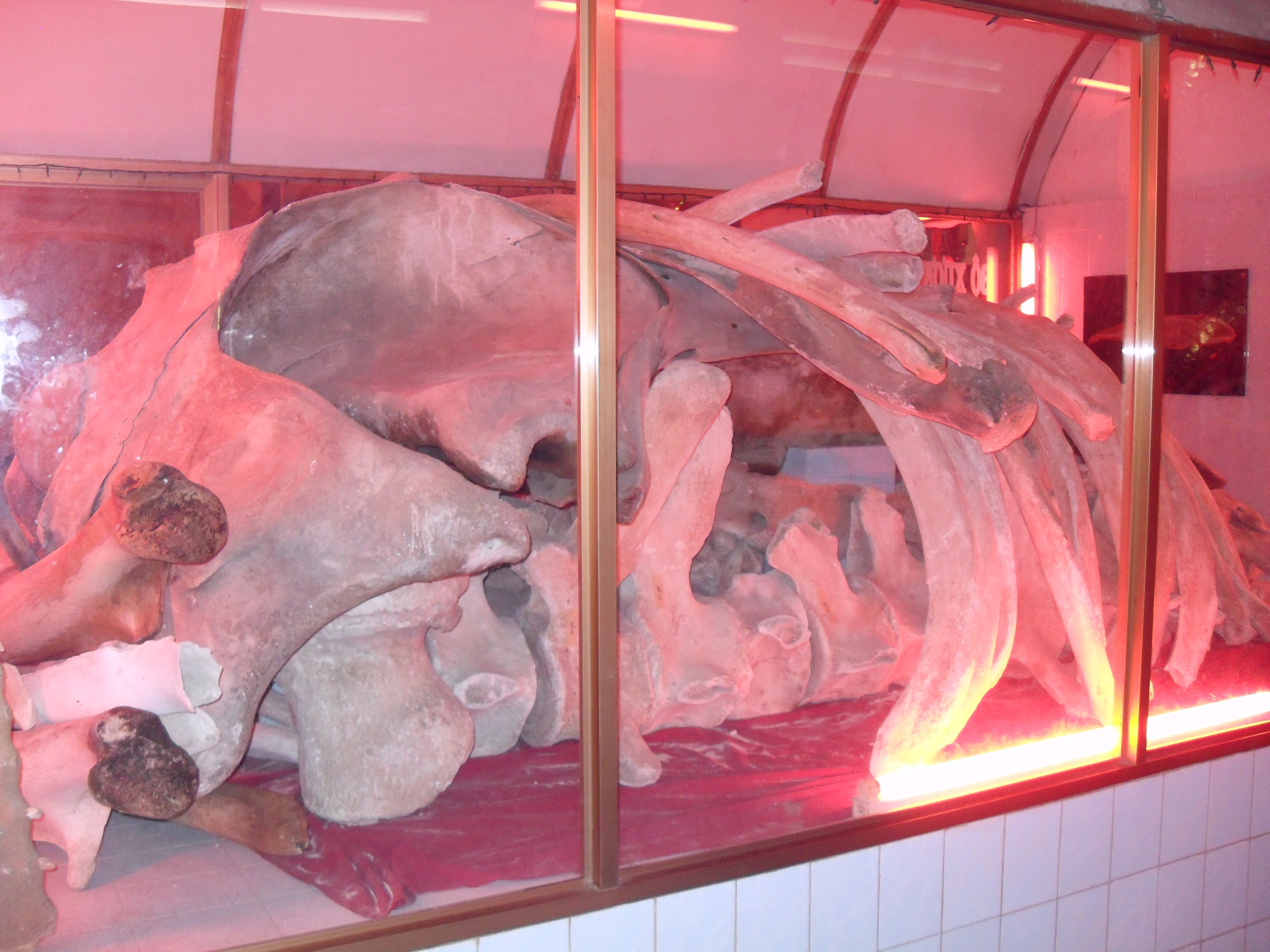
A whale skeleton in Thang Tam Temple, Vũng Tàu

Many whale worshiping festivals take place across Vietnam.

Cau Ngu festival is held annually on the 16th day of the first lunar month in many coastal provinces in Vietnam with many participants. The festival is celebrated to hope for a fruitful year of fishing and a favorable sea season. Popular folk traditions such as music, boat racing, and rowing basket boats are associated with the festival. They all contribute to the people of the coast's lively atmosphere.

"Nghinh Ong Thang Tam Vung Tau" festival, which lasts from August 15 to 18 in the lunar calendar, includes rituals such as praying the sea gods, a procession of the whale god from the sea to the Thang Tam Temple (often known as "The Whale Temple") and hosting a feast to ancestors and heroic martyrs. There is another Nghinh Ong festival which takes place in Cần Giờ district, Ho Chi Minh City.

=== Exhibition ===
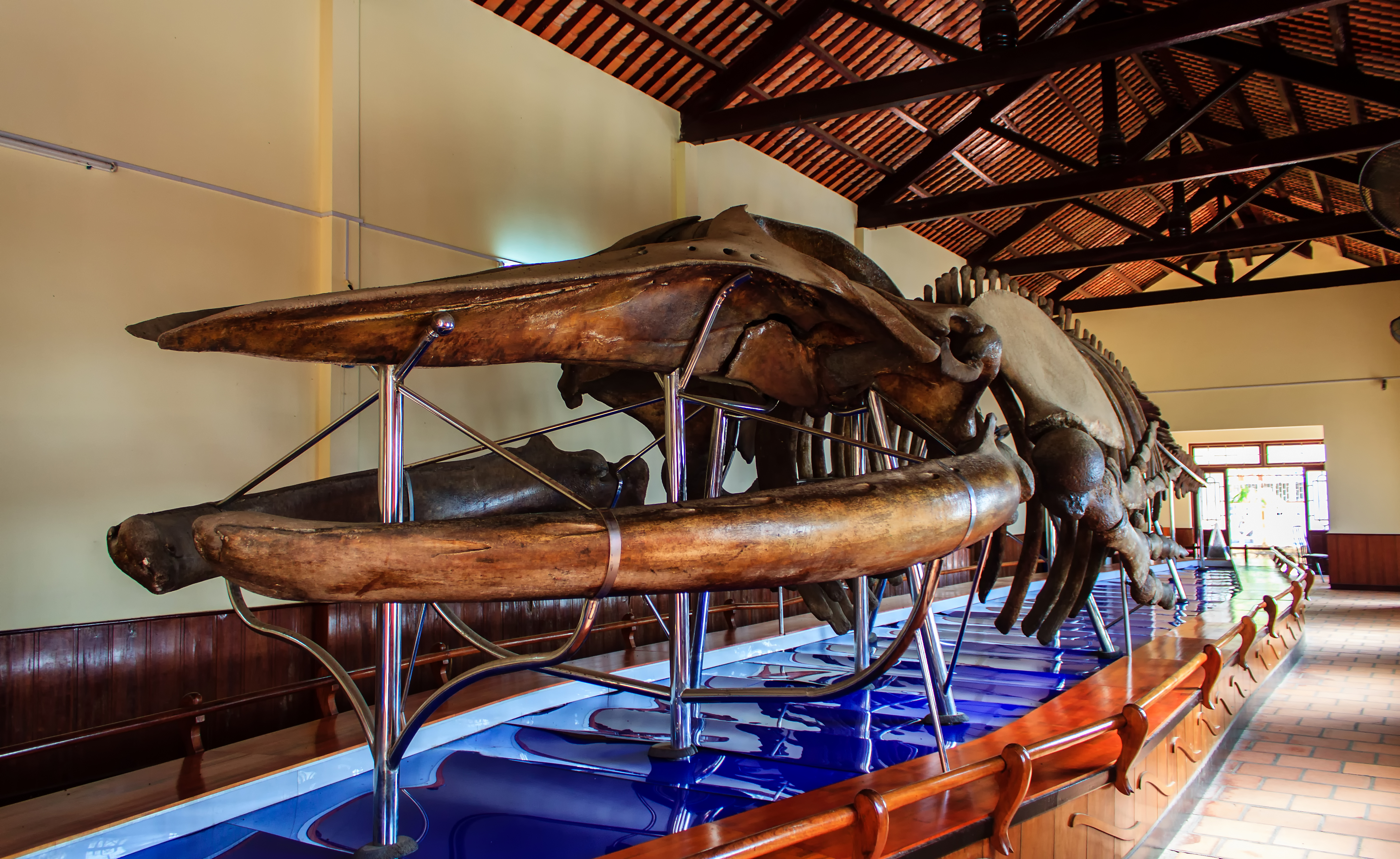
The largest whale skeleton in Vietnam and Southeast Asia until this day, located at Van Thuy Tu temple, in Phan Thiết city, Bình Thuận province, is 20 meters long and weighs 65 tons.

At the Vạn Thủy Tú relic temple in coastal town Phan Thiết, a 20-meter-long whale skeleton, Vietnam's largest, is on display. In the south-central province of Bình Thuận, Vạn Thủy Tú is located on Ngu Ong Street, Duc Thang Ward, about 150 meters from Phan Thiết Port. The relic draws a large number of interested tourists on weekends. According to legend, a massive whale beached itself here in the 18th century, after the temple was completed. It took two days to bring it to the temple, which had its front gate demolished in the process due to its size, which was over 20 meters long and weighed 65 tons, while awaiting a funeral ceremony. When the body had finally decomposed after three years, the ashes were retrieved, washed with water and good spirits, and then transferred to the temple's back to be worshipped and stored. Van Thuy Tu was classified as a national-level artistic activity in architecture by the Ministry of Culture and Information in 1996. In 2019, the Van Thuy Tu fish ceremony was declared a national intangible cultural heritage.

== Features of Japanese Ebisu worship ==
For Japanese people, the whale was a sacred being and also a subject of worship. In contrast to the Vietnamese people, the Japanese were awestruck by the huge animals that swam the vast oceans, but when whales beached, their carcasses were used for food and equipment, supplementing the locals' profits. Subsequently, the Japanese locals began killing whales for food. Many traces of whaling's history can be observed in Japan, from festivals and foods to whaling-related crafts. Whale-related traditions have been reclassified as local or national "heritage" in both nations, Japan and Vietnam, which have taken on new meanings as a result of tourism, forced or voluntary coastal depopulation, and shifting livelihoods.

=== Beliefs and acts ===
The Ebisu, to whom Japanese fishermen pray for a good catch while fishing, as well as the Ebisu-sama enshrined on the coasts of fishing villages or in each fisherman's household's Ebisu altar (regardless of the particular form of the enshrined object of worship), are now regarded as one of the Seven Deities of Good Fortune by the fishermen themselves (Naumann, 1974, p. 2). Legends of stones washing up on shore and revered as Ebisu, as well as seasonal customs of fishing villages such as diving for a stone that is made the focus of Ebisu worship, are common in South Kyushu, moreover, the older tradition in comparison to the worship of the dragnet's huge central float (and often the corresponding sinker) as the personification of Ebisu (Naumann, 1974, p. 2). The Ebisu-float or Ebisu-sinker is worshipped in large net-fisheries along the coasts of the Sea of Japan and the Inland Sea, but their relation is uncertain (Naumann, 1974, p. 3). It seems to point to a slightly strange Buddhist custom at best when, inside the former whaling districts of Japan, old memorial stones dedicated to whales are first erected in the cemeteries on the shore, bearing as an epigraph the Buddhistic formula of redemption Namu Amida Butsu or other Buddhistic sayings, which implore the rebirth of the whale as a Buddha, or Buddhistic Masses for the dead were performed in honor of whales that were slaughtered (Naumann, 1974, p. 4). The fishermen who witness the massive animal's death-struggle recite Namu Amida Butsu three times in chorus in front of the dead whale, then sing one of the so-called whale songs to "pacify his soul". Whale embryos discovered in their mother's womb are removed with the utmost precaution and interred as a human being with proper reverence and special rituals, or that the bones of the killed whale are also preserved in the vicinity of a shrine in some areas (Naumann, 1974, p. 5).

In fishermen's sea language, whales, dolphins, and sharks are referred to as "Ebisu" (Naumann, 1974, p. 8). If treated with respect, whales and sharks are said to chase shoals of small fish toward the shore. However, if they are enraged by loud yelling or inappropriate conduct, they can scare away the fish or do significant harm. The whale and shark claim to be the master or owner of the marine animals in this situation. And it is because of these facts that whales and sharks are called Ebisu or are associated with Ebisu (Naumann, 1974, p. 14).

=== Festivals ===
Toka Ebisu is Kyoto's first major festival of the year. Ebisu is the deity of good fortune and wealth, and "Toka" means tenth day. Though the festival is centered on 10 January, it only lasts five days, from the 8th to the 12th. Thousands of tourists flock to Ebisu Shrine at this period to perform a simple rite of prayer for continued progress in their work and company.

== See also ==
- Whaling
- Whale watching
- Vietnamese folk religion
- Animal worship
