= Ông Trời =

Vietnamese supreme deity

- Ông Trời; Ngọc Hoàng
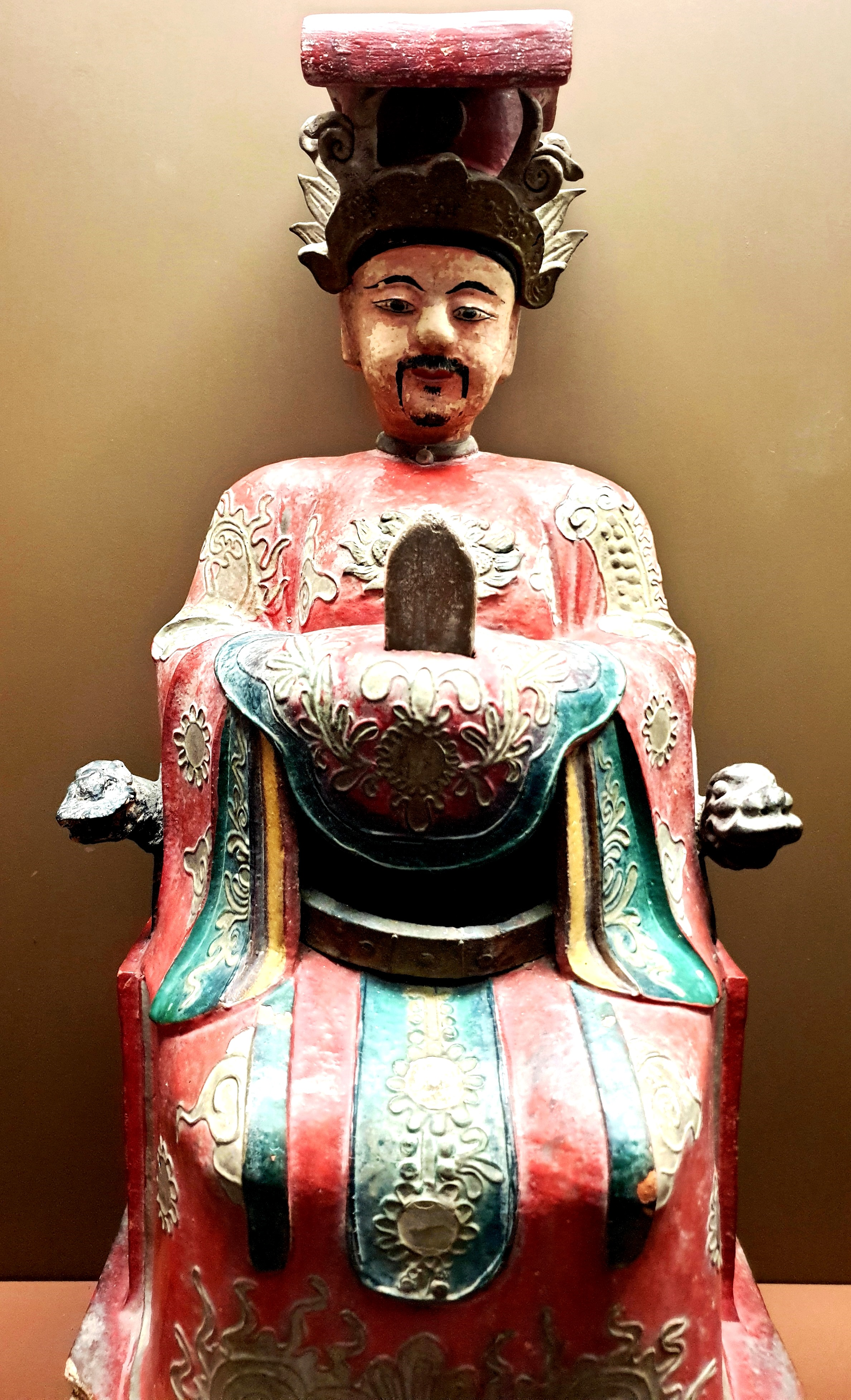
- Ngọc Hoàng statue, Nguyễn dynasty antiquities
- Vietnamese alphabet: Ông Trời; Ngọc Hoàng
- Chữ Hán: 玉皇
- Chữ Nôm: 翁𡗶

Ông Trời (lit. 'old man sky/heaven'), commonly referred to as Trời (lit. 'sky, heaven'), is one of the most important gods in traditional Vietnamese folk religion. Later, due to the influence of Taoism, he was at times associated with the Jade Emperor, called the Ngọc Hoàng Thượng Đế, often referred to as Ngọc Hoàng or Thượng Đế.

== Names ==
Ông Trời is referred to by many names depending on the religious circumstances. In South Vietnam, he is often called Ông Thiên (翁天). In Đạo Mẫu, he is called the Vua Cha Ngọc Hoàng (𢂜吒玉皇, Monarchical Father Ngọc Hoàng), as he is the father of Liễu Hạnh. In Vietnamese Buddhism, he is frequently identified with Śakra (Đế Thích Thiên; 帝釋天).

Later, under the influence of Taoism, he was also at times associated with the Jade Emperor, commonly referred to as Ngọc Hoàng (玉皇) — a shortened form of Ngọc Hoàng Thượng Đế (玉皇上帝) or Ngọc Hoàng Đại Đế (玉皇大帝).

== Mythology ==
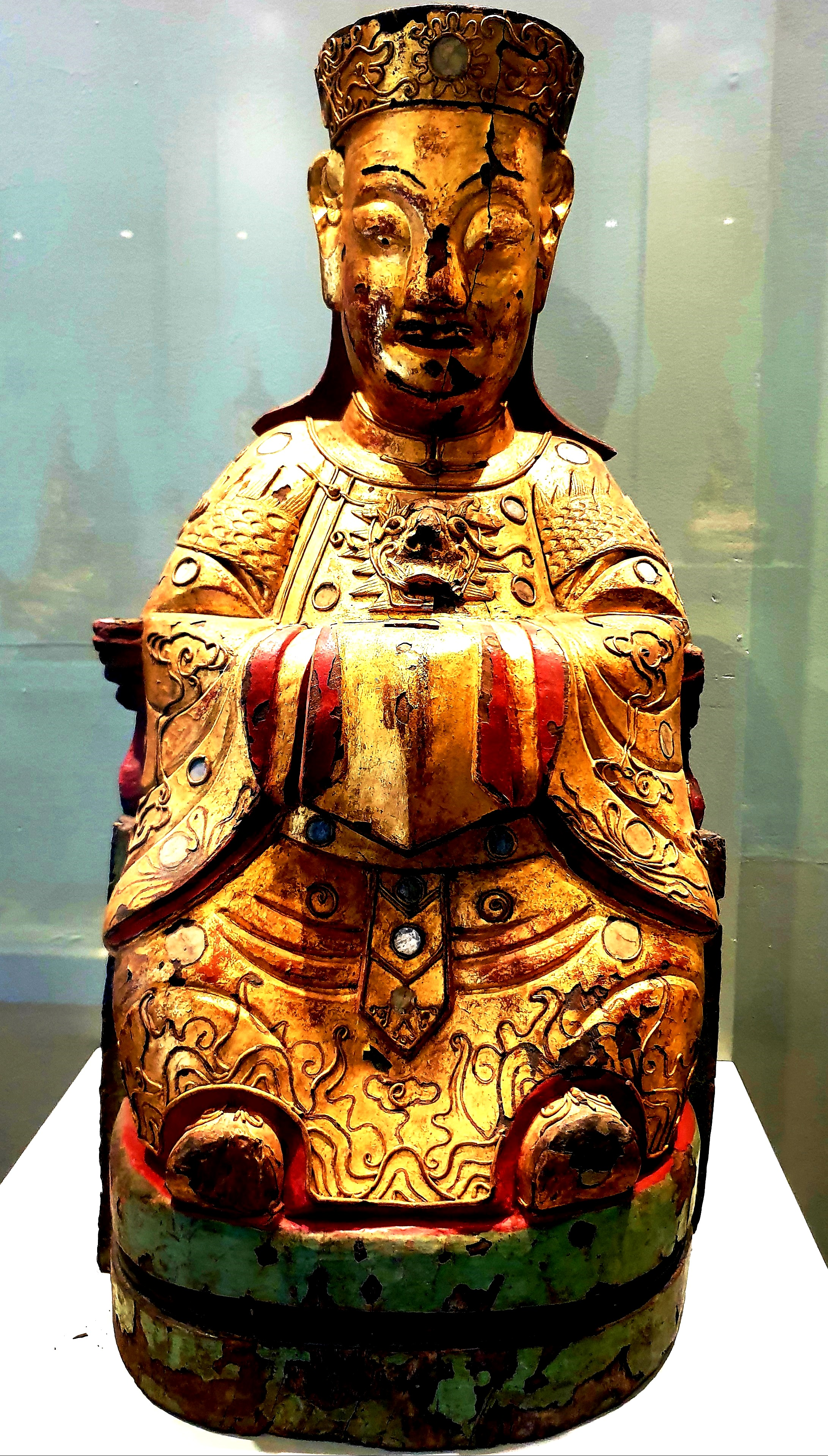
Ngọc Hoàng statue in Ho Chi Minh City Museum of Fine Arts

Ông Trời was originally a Vietnamese god, but due to later influence by Taoism from China, this god was at times associated with the Jade Emperor (Ngọc Hoàng).

=== Origin ===
The origin of this god is not agreed upon, according to one of the most popular stories recounted that:

Once upon a time, before all things, there was a god. Trời is an incomparable power above, making everything: the earth, the mountains, the rivers, the sea, the rain, and the sun. Trời gave birth to all human beings, animals, and plants...

Trời sees everything and knows everything that happens in the world. Trời is the father of all things, considering all things, rewards and punishments do not leave anyone, no one escapes the net of heaven, everything is determined by heaven. Therefore, people believe in heaven's way, and often say that creation was born and raised by Trời, and when a person dies, they return to heaven.

Ông Trời also has a wife, called Bà Trời (or Tây Vương Mẫu), and every time they get angry at each other, it's both sunny and rainy. Every time Trời is angry with humans for making mistakes in the world, natural disasters will be sent: storms, floods, droughts...

He is the first god of heaven who created mankind. The Ngọc Hoàng used the residue left in heaven and earth to mold all kinds of animals, from the big ones to the small ones like bugs. After that, Trời decanted the clean substance to mold human. Therefore, humans are wiser than animals. Later, the job of shaping people was assigned by Ngọc Hoàng to twelve Bà mụ.

The Trời's country is from the ground up to above, there are nine heavens. The Ngọc Hoàng was in the palace and was imitated by the emperor below. At the door of the palace, there is a god in armor holding a staff to hold the door. Ngọc Hoàng met here, the court was no different from that in the lower world, there were mandarins, martial arts officers, and generals, that is, the gods of heaven, the army of Trời to punish the rebellious gods. Ngọc Hoàng also has a family, a wife, and children.

Ngọc Hoàng's wife is Tây Vương Mẫu, in Côn Lôn mountain, the world of fairies, with a herd of fairies. Tây Vương Mẫu has a garden of Bàn Đào, the fruit ripens once every three thousand years when eaten, it gives birth to immortality, often used to prepare feasts for the gods in heaven. Tây Vương Mẫu is a woman of outstanding beauty, with three blue birds specializing in finding food for Vương Mẫu, turning into a flock of beautiful and graceful maids.

The Ngọc Hoàng is always dressed in imperial attire, a shirt embroidered with a golden dragon, a hat with red tassels on his head, leading thirteen five-colored pearls, and holding hốt in hand. The Ngọc Hoàng sits on the throne to touch the dragon each time he meets the dynasty, and deals with things in heaven or on earth. On the left and right sides of Ngọc Hoàng, there are gods of heaven waiting for the Ngọc Hoàng to command. Heaven is divided into nine levels, some say it's thirty-three, and the gods are more or less related to each other according to their titles and relationships. Ngọc Hoàng is the highest rank, on the first floor.

Some other versions say that the god, Thần Trụ Trời and Ông Trời are one.

== Worship ==
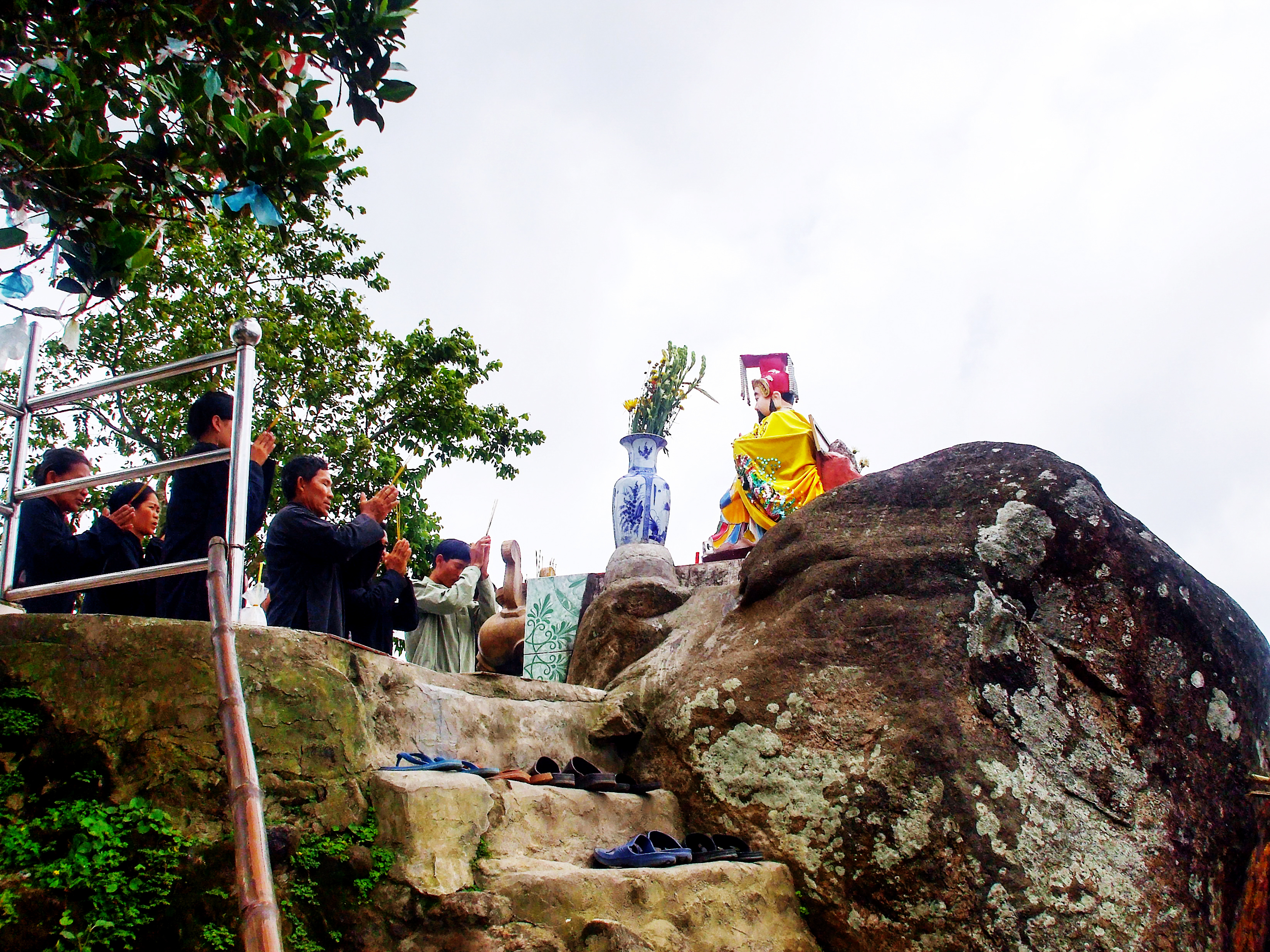
People are carrying out worshiping Ông Trời at Vồ Bồ Hong, Cấm Mountain

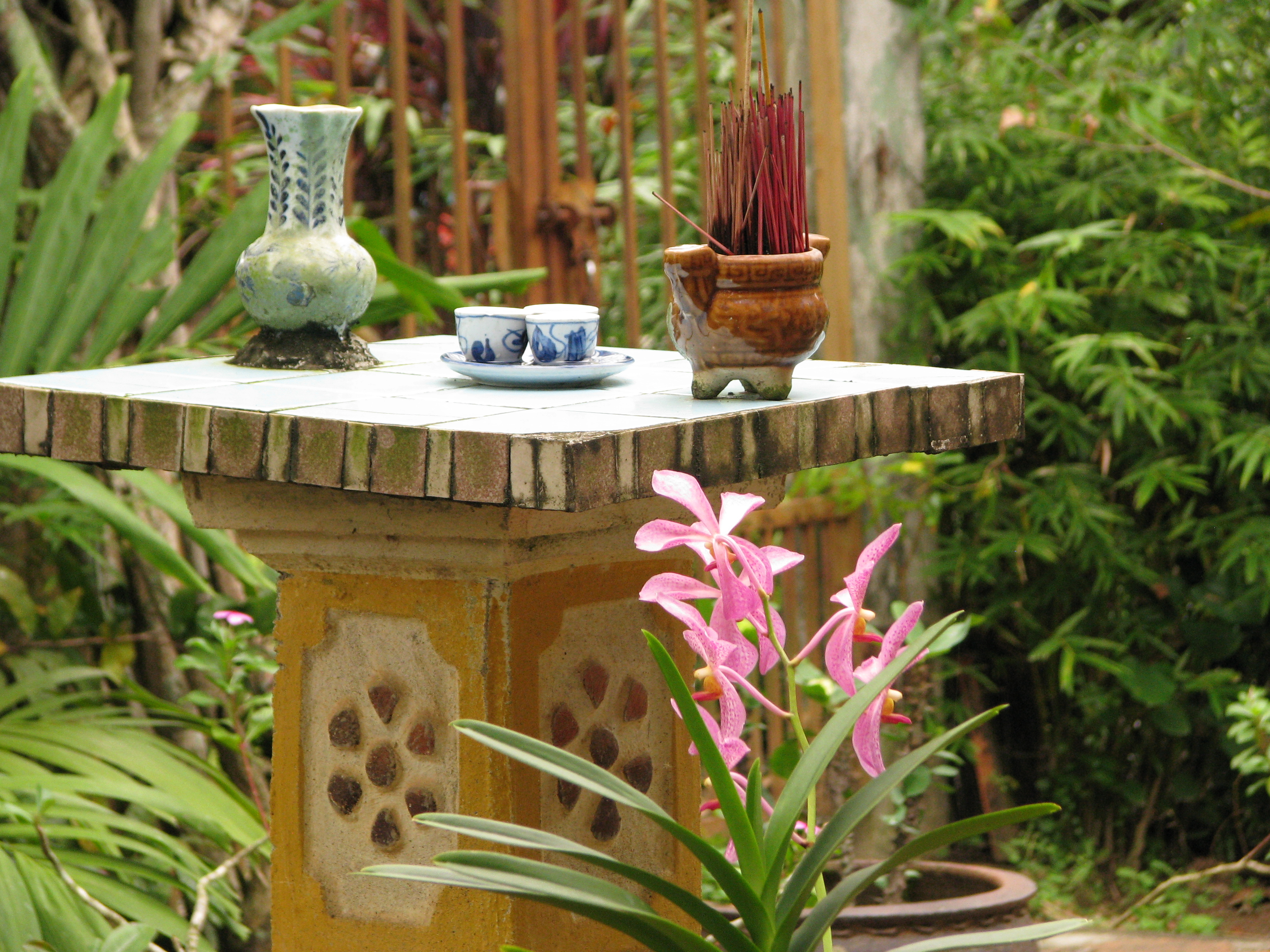
A Bàn thiên in Vĩnh Long

He is worshiped all over Vietnam; there are many temples and shrines dedicated to him. In South and Central Vietnam, families often worship him at an outdoor altar called Bàn Thiên.

== In popular culture ==
Television program

- Gặp nhau cuối năm

An interjection used in Vietnamese "Trời ơi!" (hey heavenly (lord)) is often translated into English as "for goodness' sake!" or "dear God!" or "what the hell!".

== Gallery ==
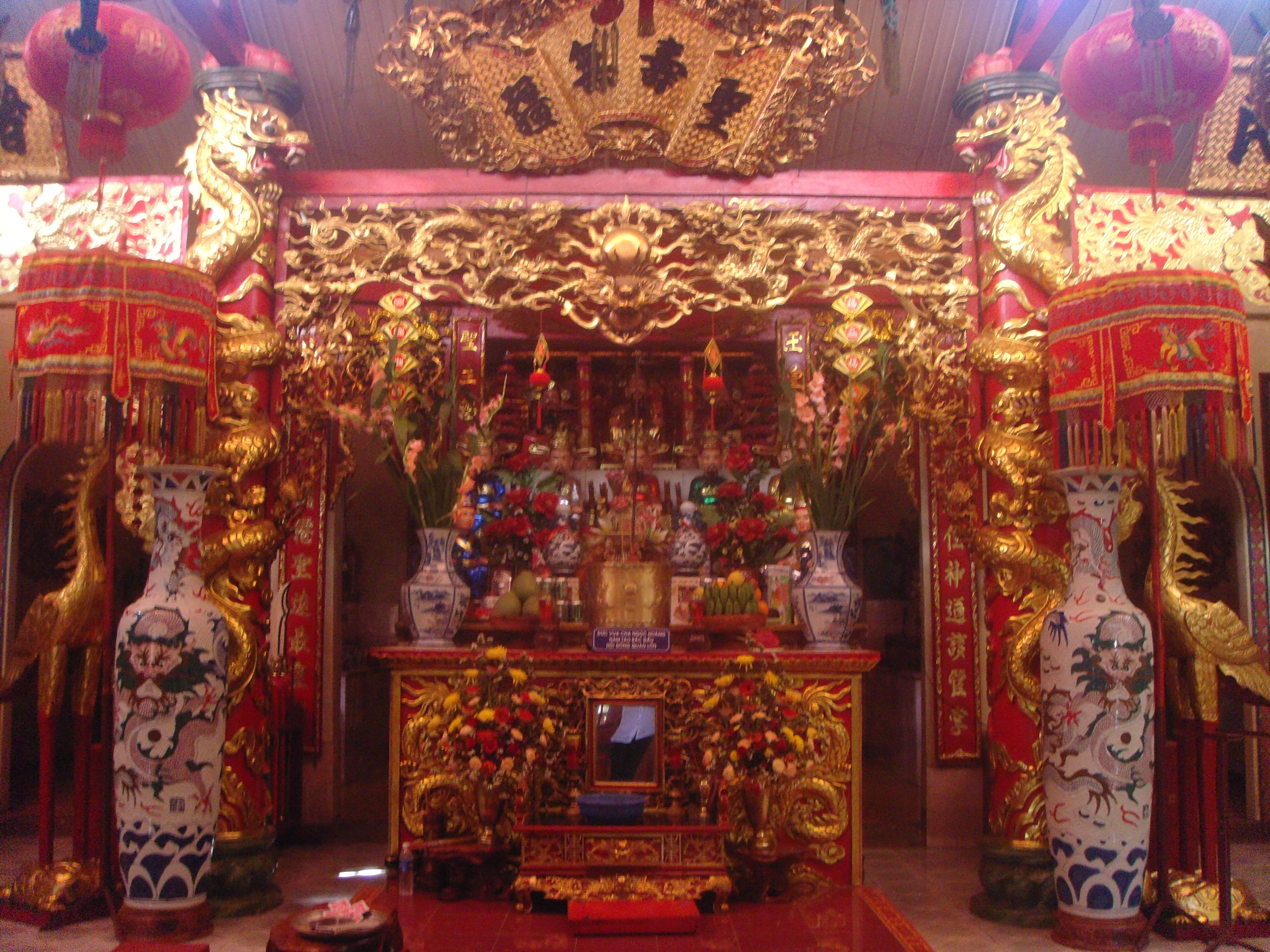
Đức Vua Cha Ngọc Hoàng with two other gods, Nam Tào and Bắc Đẩu, in Vạn Kiếp Temple.

== See also ==
- Vietnamese folk religion
- Vietnamese mythology
- Đạo Mẫu
- Yin and yang

Counterparts of Ông Trời in other cultures

- Amenominakanushi, the Japanese counterpart.
- Indra/Trimurti, the Hindu counterpart.
- Jade Emperor, the Chinese and Taoist counterpart.
- Śakra, the Buddhist counterpart.
- Haneunim, the Korean counterpart.
- Tengri, the Turko-Mongolian counterpart.
- Thagyamin, the Burmese Buddhist representation of Śakra, a counterpart of the Jade Emperor.
- Yuanshi Tianzun, the Taoist counterpart.
