= Bà mụ =

12 fertility goddesses of Vietnamese folk religion

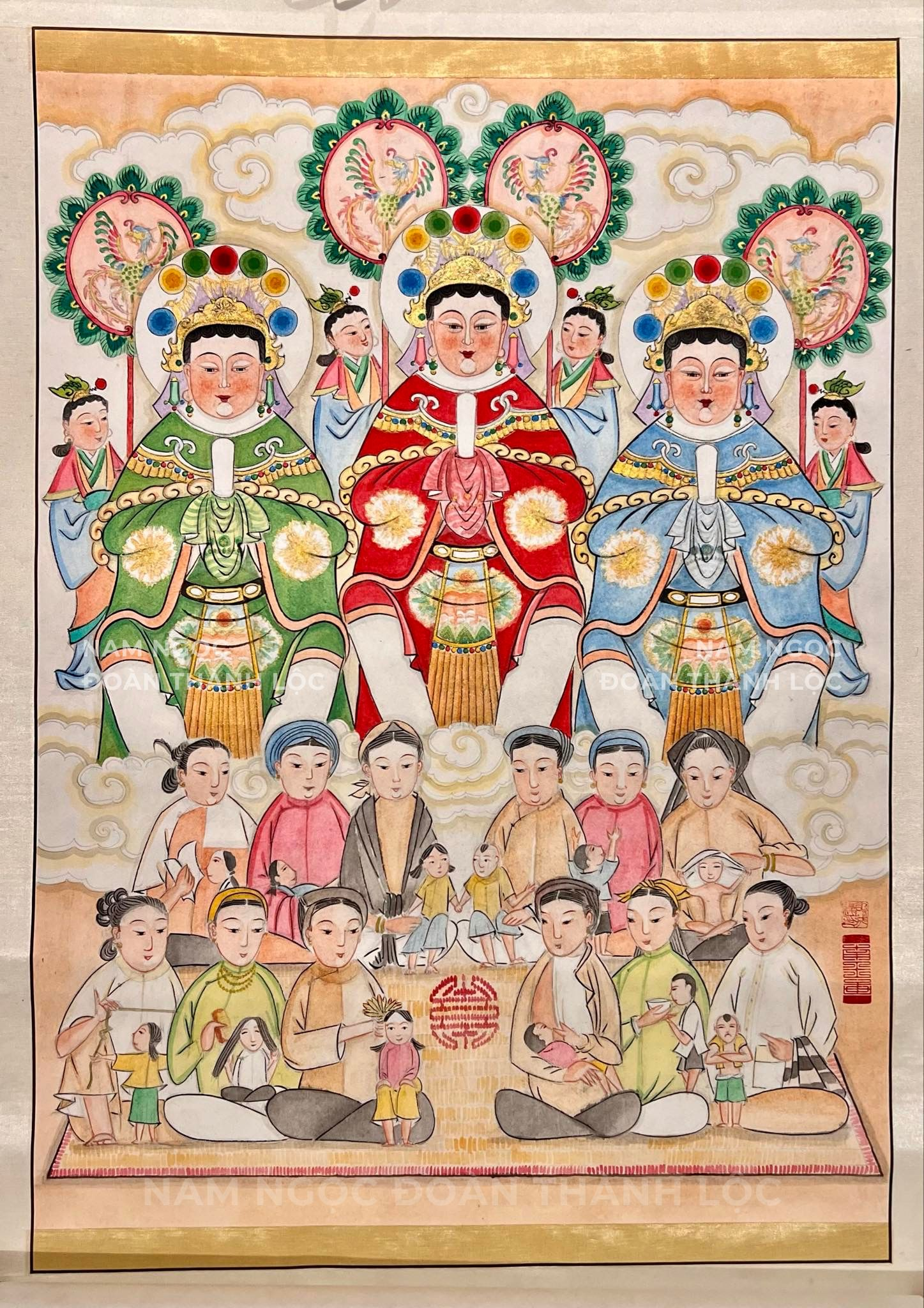
The goddesses who bless pregnancies, mothers and children in Vietnamese culture, including the Three Ladies Tiêu and 12 Midwives

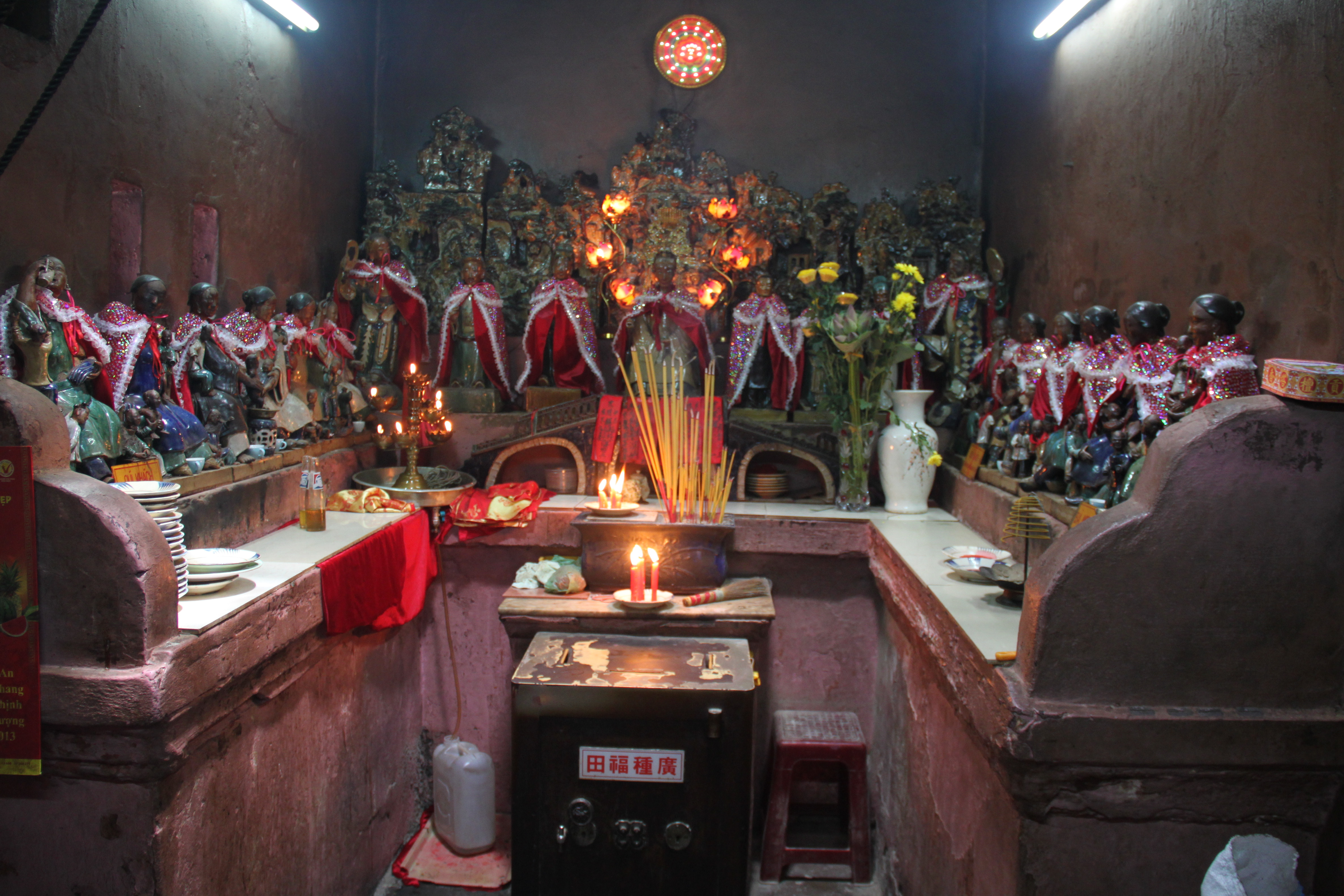
Statue of 12 Bà mụ and Kim Hoa Thánh Mẫu at Jade Emperor Pagoda

The Mười hai Bà mụ (chữ Nôm: 𱑕𠄩婆媒), or Thập nhị Bà thư (Twelve Midwives, 十二婆姐), Thập Nhị Hoa Nương (Twelve Flower Ladies, 十二花娘), also called Mẹ Sanh (or Mẹ Sinh, 媄生) are deities from Vietnamese mythology and folk religion. They are twelve fairies who teach babies various prosperous traits and skills such as sucking and smiling. In some parts of Vietnam when a baby is one month old a special ritual is performed for the Twelve Midwives.

== Mythology ==
The mythology of 12 Bà Mụ was told by Nguyễn Đổng Chi in the book Lược Khảo Về Thần Thoại Việt Nam: The mythology of these 12 goddesses is now only vaguely known to us. There is a theory that it is the gods who helped the Ngọc Hoàng from the time he intended to create mankind. but there is also a theory that these are the gods entrusted by the Ngọc Hoàng after he created a sufficient number of people and things in the lower world. In other words, the 12 Bà mụ are gods who are responsible for shaping someone's body when ordered to reincarnate.

The number 12 Bà Mụ is often explained by a few different points of view: there is a view that it is a collective responsible for the creation of a human being, and another explanation is that each Bà Mụ takes care of a different person jobs: people who shape ears, people who shape eyes, people who shape limbs, people who teach children to laugh, people who teach children say. In the South of Vietnam, there is a concept that 12 Bà Mụ are 12 people who take turns taking care of maternity for 12 years, calculated according to the "thập nhị chi" - i.e. according to the 12 zodiac animals.

== List of 12 Midwives/ Flower Ladies ==
The 12 Midwives/ Flower Ladies, each of whom holds a job in birth and foster care, are:

1. Chú Sanh Hoa Nương (註生花娘), presides over childbirth. Traditionally identified as the midwife goddess Trần Tứ Nương.
2. Chú Thai Hoa Nương (註胎花娘), presides over pregnancy and gestation. Traditionally identified as the midwife goddess Vạn Tứ Nương.
3. Thủ Thai Hoa Nương (守胎花娘), presides over conception. Traditionally identified as the midwife goddess Lâm Cửu Nương.
4. Chú Hình Hoa Nương (註形花娘), presides over shaping the child’s bodily form and determining whether the child is male or female. Traditionally identified as the midwife goddess Lưu Thất Nương.
5. An Thai Hoa Nương (安胎花娘), presides over the care and protection of the fetus. Traditionally identified as the midwife goddess Lâm Nhất Nương.
6. Chuyển Sanh Hoa Nương (轉生花娘), presides over labor and the onset of childbirth. Traditionally identified as the midwife goddess Lý Đại Nương.
7. Hộ Sản Hoa Nương (護產花娘), presides over delivery and the safe birth of the child. Traditionally identified as the midwife goddess Hứa Đại Nương.
8. Dưỡng Sanh Hoa Nương (養生花娘), presides over postpartum confinement and recovery. Traditionally identified as the midwife goddess Cao Tứ Nương.
9. Bảo Tống Hoa Nương (保送花娘), presides over the care of newborn infants. Traditionally identified as the midwife goddess Tăng Ngũ Nương.
10. Tống Tử Hoa Nương (送子花娘), presides over carrying and tending to young children. Traditionally identified as the midwife goddess Mã Ngũ Nương.
11. Bảo Tử Hoa Nương (保子花娘), presides over guarding and caring for children. Traditionally identified as the midwife goddess Trúc Ngũ Nương.
12. Giám Sanh Hoa Nương (監生花娘), presides over witnessing and overseeing childbirth. Traditionally identified as the midwife goddess Nguyễn Tam Nương.

== Customs ==
The Twelve Flower Ladies are commonly regarded as attendants to female deities who preside over childbirth, such as the Tam Tiêu Nương Nương (Three Ladies Tiêu) or Kim Hoa Thánh Mẫu (Mother Goddess Kim Hoa), the latter being worshipped at Điện Ngọc Hoàng in Ho Chi Minh City.

The Bà Mụ are also worshipped at a number of temples and pagodas, including chùa Hóc Ông, chùa Biên Hòa, chùa Phước Tường Thủ Đức, chùa Hưng Long, and chùa Minh Hương Gia Thạnh Chợ Lớn.

Within the household, the Bà Mụ may be invoked when a woman has recently given birth or when children in the family fall ill. They are especially honored in the ritual known as cúng Mụ, performed at several important stages in an infant’s early life: đầy cữ, three days after birth; đầy tháng, one month after birth; đầy tuổi tôi, one hundred days after birth; and thôi nôi, the child’s first birthday.

== See also ==
- Thirteen Đức Thầy
