= Sơn Tinh – Thủy Tinh =

Vietnamese myth

Sơn Tinh – Thủy Tinh (The Mountain God vs. The Lord of the Waters) is a Vietnamese myth. It explains the practice of tidal irrigation and devastating floods in Vietnam as a result of the monsoon. The monsoon is a seasonal prevailing wind in the region of South and Southeast Asia, blowing from the southwest between May and September and bringing rain (the wet monsoon), or from the northeast between October and April (the dry monsoon).

Sơn Tinh is also one of the Four Immortals, specifically Tản Viên Sơn Thánh.

== Myth ==
Hùng Duệ Vương, the 18th king of the Hồng Bàng dynasty, had a beautiful daughter named Mỵ Nương. When she came of age, the King began his search to arrange her marriage. He wanted to find a special son-in-law, someone who was intelligent, handsome, and talented. To find such an individual, the King held an official contest. Anyone who could prove his worthiness would be given the hand of his daughter. Princes, scholars, famous writers, gifted artists, wealthy merchants, and men with various talents came from everywhere to compete. Among them were two extraordinary men: Sơn Tinh, the Mountain God, and Thủy Tinh, the Lord of the Waters.

The King requested both to showcase their powers. Sơn Tinh made a gesture with his hand in the air, and trees instantly sprouted from the earth into a forest. With a magic word, mountains rose. Thủy Tinh's powers were no less impressive. With a wave of his hand, gusts of wind began to blow. With a single word, the sea level rose.

However, as both met all the criteria required to become Mỵ Nương's husband, it was difficult to choose between them. Eventually, the King decided to present one final challenge: the first man to arrive with selected wedding gifts the next morning would be granted permission to marry the princess. These wedding gifts included a nine-tusk elephant, a nine-spur cockerel, and a nine-mane horse, all found on land and not in the sea, which placed Thủy Tinh at a disadvantage. Early the next morning, Sơn Tinh arrived first, married Mỵ Nương, and took her back to Tản Viên Mountain, where he lived.

Thủy Tinh arrived a few moments afterwards. Upon realizing that he was too late, he became furious. He and his servants chased after Sơn Tinh. Unwilling to accept defeat, he summoned torrential rain, gusty winds, thunder and lightning, and raised the sea to defeat Sơn Tinh. However, as the sea rose, Sơn Tinh used his magic to raise the height of the mountains as a counter-measure. Everyone suffered the rage of Thủy Tinh as the floods he caused destroyed land, crops, and houses. To protect the people and their property and belongings, Sơn Tinh created dikes to shield them from the rising sea.

The battle between the two lords lasted for countless days, but Thủy Tinh eventually became weary and lowered the sea. However, he never forgave Sơn Tinh or let go of his desire for revenge and to get Mỵ Nương back. According to the myth, this is why people suffer floods every year, as a consequence of Thủy Tinh's eternal vindictiveness.

== Literature and music ==
- The poem "Sơn Tinh, Thủy Tinh" by Nguyễn Nhược Pháp.
- The play Truyền thuyết Sơn Tinh Thủy Tinh (The myth of Sơn Tinh, Thủy Tinh) by Thanh Phương.
- The song "Chuyện tình Thủy Thần" (The God of the Water's love story) written by lead singer Trần Lập, performed by the Bức Tường band.

== See also ==
- Channa Husband
