= Tản Viên Sơn Thánh =

God of Ba Vì mountain range

- God of Ba Vì mountain range
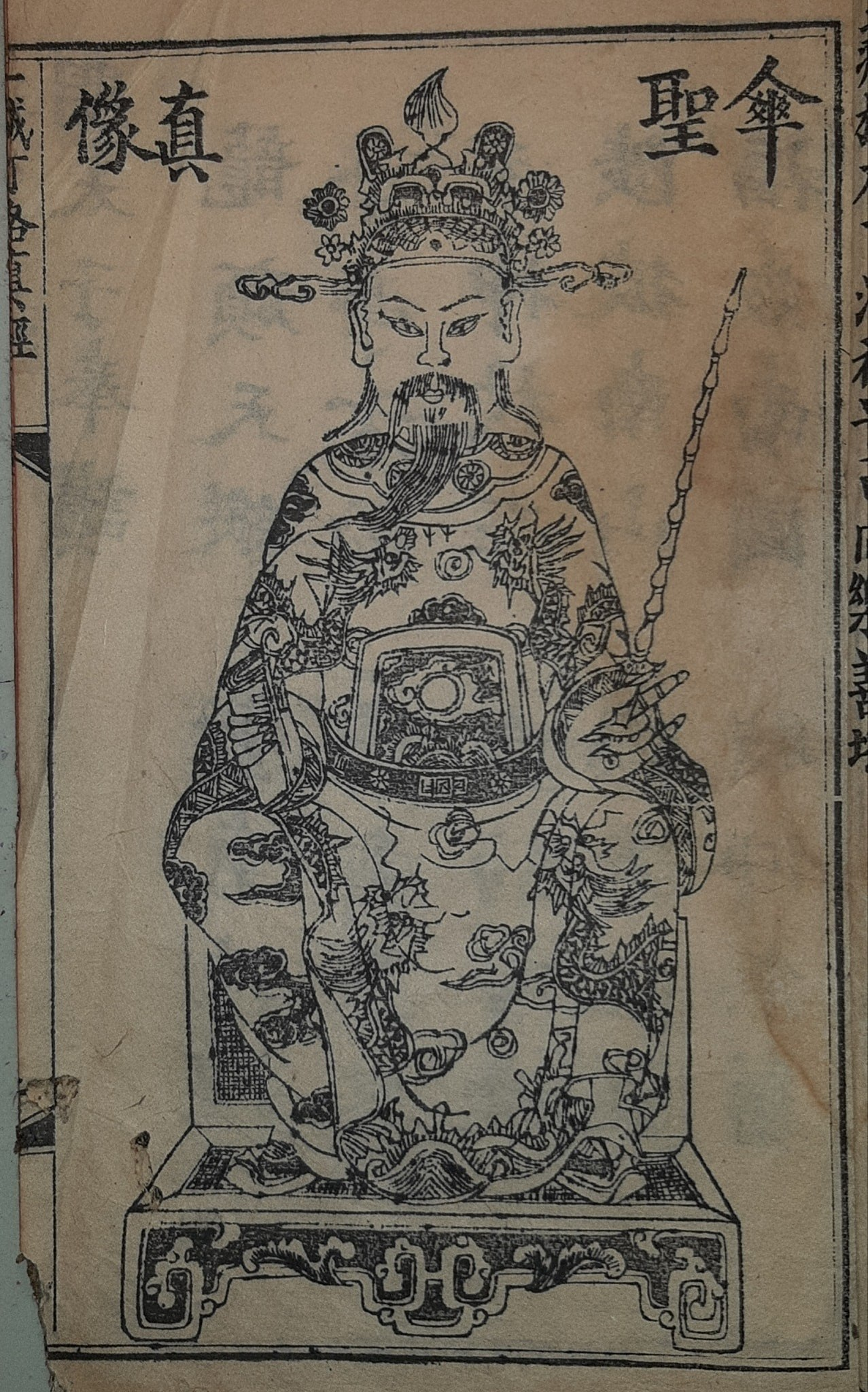
- Painting of Tản Viên Sơn Thánh in the book Nhất thành khả cách chân kinh

Genealogy
- Parents: Lạc Long Quân and Âu Cơ
- Siblings: Cao Sơn, Quý Minh (and Lạc Long Quân's remaining children)
- Consort: Mỵ Nương Ngọc Hoa
- Children: Mẫu Thượng Ngàn

Tản Viên Sơn Thánh (Chữ Hán: 傘圓山聖, 304 BCE - ?), or Sơn Tinh (山精) is one of The Four Immortals in traditional Vietnamese mythology. He is the god of the Ba Vì mountain range and figures also in the romance of Sơn Tinh - Thủy Tinh ("the God of the Mountain and the God of the Water").

Temples are dedicated to him in most towns, for example the Và Temple in Sơn Tây, Hanoi.

== Mythology ==
Tản Viên Sơn Thánh was one of the 50 children who followed Lạc Long Quân to the sea, and later returned to the mainland. He sailed from Thần Phù sea gate (Nam Định) along the Red River to Long Biên citadel, but then he criticized this place for being too bustling and left for Phúc Lộc river, then settled in Tản Viên mountain.
