= Chử Đồng Tử =

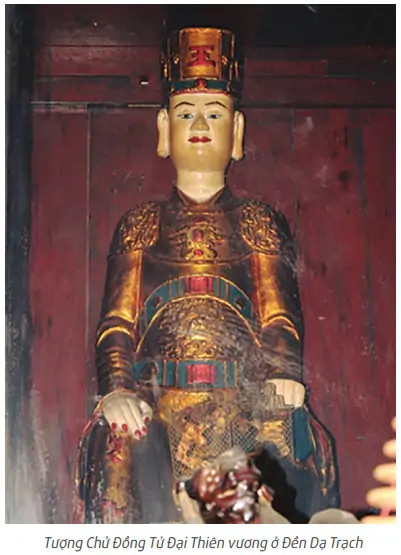
Chử Đồng Tử statue at Dạ Trạch Temple

Chử Đồng Tử (Chữ Hán: 褚童子) is the name of a famous Vietnamese divine being, one of "The Four Immortals" "Tứ bất tử" in traditional Vietnamese mythology. In legends, Chử Đồng Tử appeared on a yellow or golden dragon to Triệu Quang Phục the sixth-century resistance leader against the Chinese Liang dynasty.

== Mythology ==
Chử was born in an extremely poor fishing family. He and his father possessed nothing but a single loincloth. When his father died, Chử Đồng Tử did not want to bury his father while naked. Afraid of being seen bare by others, Chử retreated to a marsh where few people would approach.

One day, Princess Tiên Dung (仙容) passed by the marsh. She ordered her servant to put up curtains while she took a bath. Coincidentally, the spot she chose to bathe in was exactly where Chử was hiding himself. Upon discovering the youth, the Princess reckoned that this meeting must be fate and proposed to Chử.

The king was enraged by his daughter's marriage to a poor commoner. He disowned Princess Tiên Dung and her husband. They were forced to wander and work to feed themselves. Chử Đồng Tử took up trading as his occupation. Whilst on a caravan or business trip, he docked at an island on the sea where he met a sage named Phật Quang (佛光). Chử remained behind to become his disciple. Upon completing his study, his master gave him a stick and a hat.

Upon returning to his wife and wandering lifestyle, one day the couple found themselves in a vast field with no shelter under the pouring hail. Chử drove the stick into the ground and used the hat to shield his wife. To their amazement, the stick and the hat transformed into a grand palace with many servants. People from nearby villages came and pledged their allegiance to the princess and her husband.

Assuming that his daughter was rebelling against him, the king led a force to subjugate her. The princess and her husband refused to fight him, so with their castle and servants, they ascended into heaven. The spot where the castle once stood is now called Nhất Dạ (meaning One Night).
