= Thánh Gióng =

Mythical folk hero of Vietnam

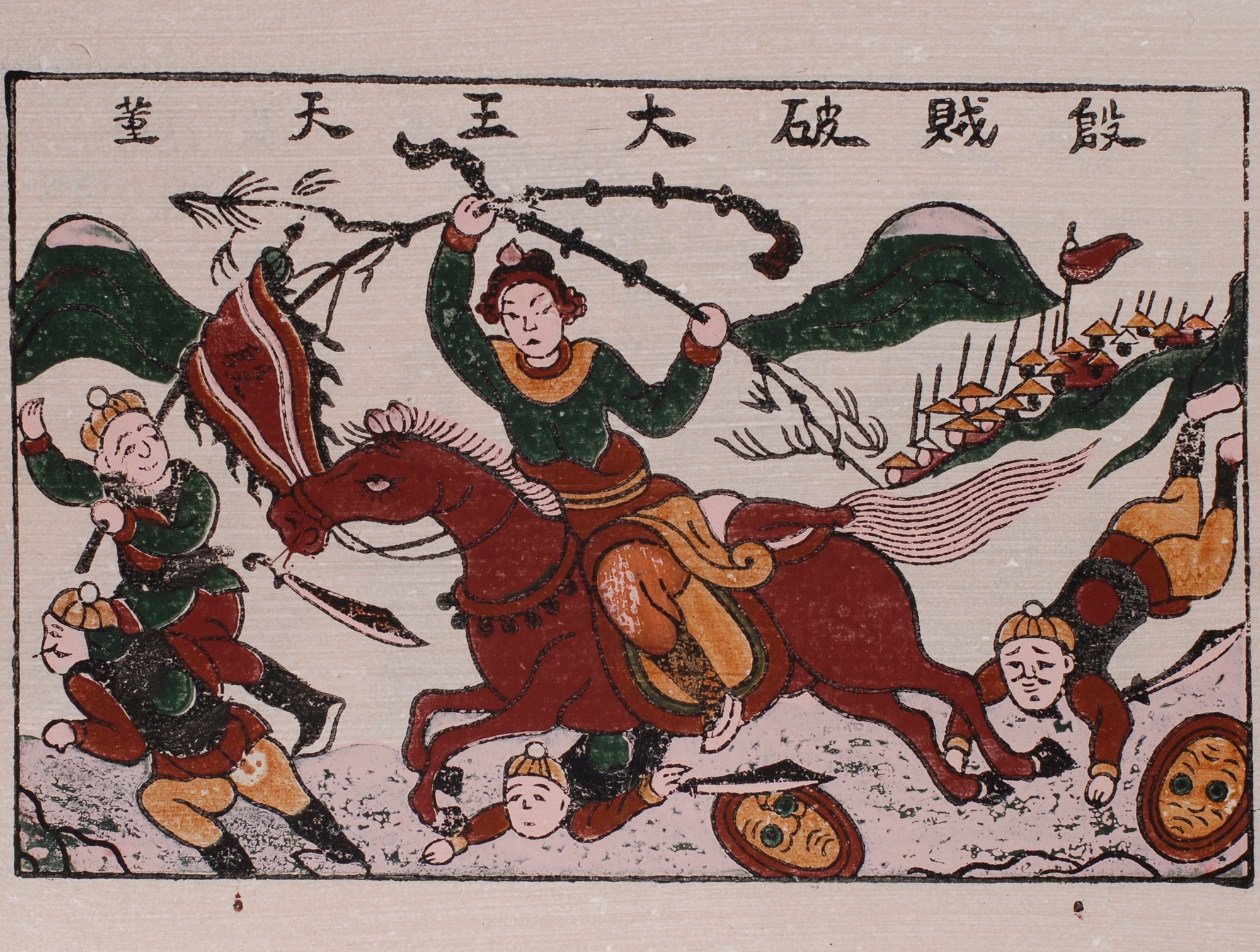
Đông Hồ painting depicts Phù Đổng Thiên Vương

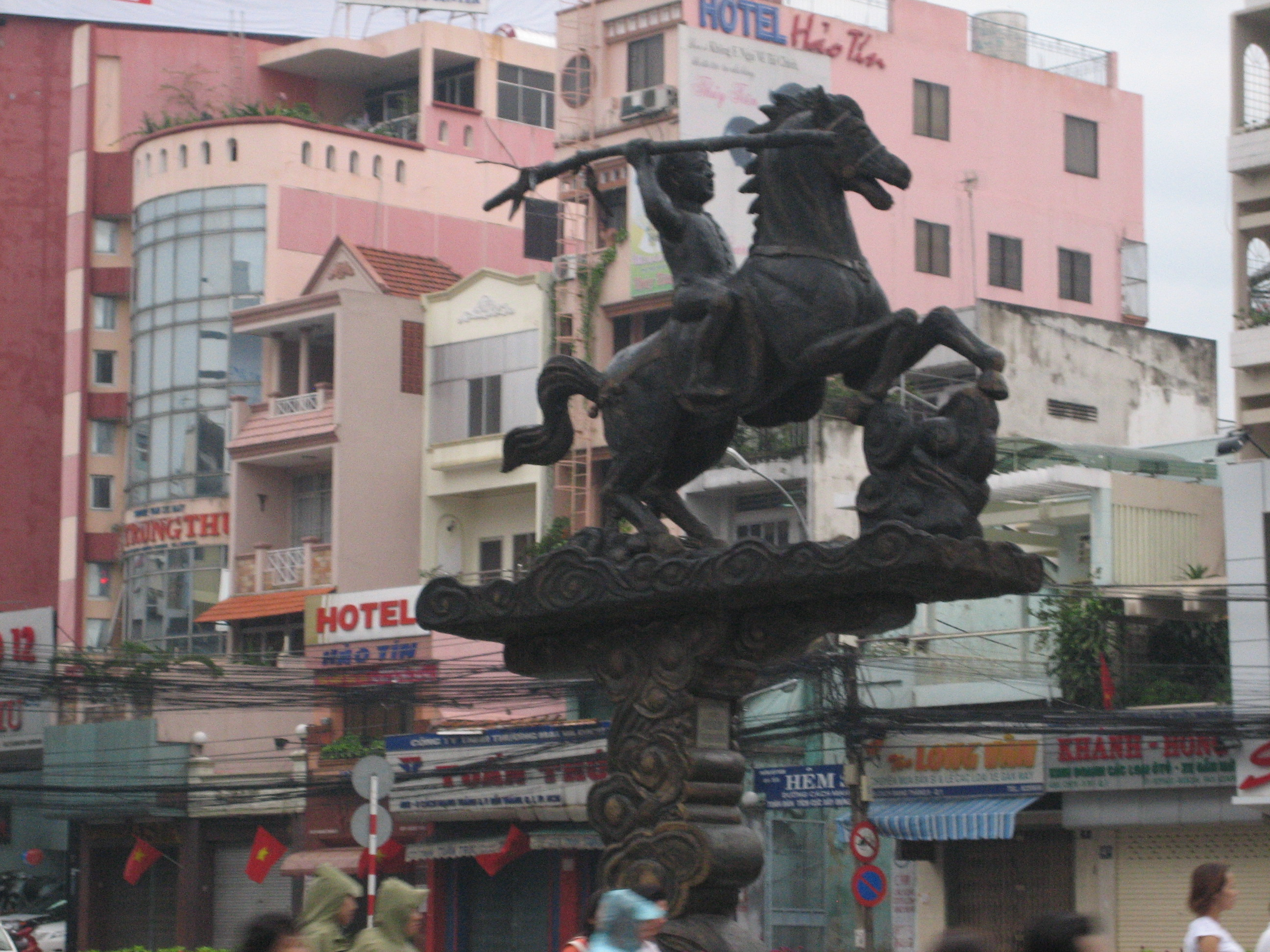
Statue of little Thánh Gióng at Phù Đổng Six-Way Intersection, Ho Chi Minh City

Thánh Gióng (chữ Nôm: 聖揀; lit. 'Saint Gióng'), also known as Phù Đổng Thiên Vương (chữ Hán: 扶董天王, Heavenly Prince of Phù Đổng), Sóc Thiên Vương (chữ Hán: 朔天王), Ông Gióng (翁揀, sir Gióng) and Xung Thiên Thần Vương (冲天神王, Divine Prince of Heaven) is a mythical folk hero of Vietnam's history and one of The Four Immortals. According to the legend, Gióng was a boy who rode on an iron horse and won against the enemy of the state. The most well known version of the legend had him battle against the Chinese army, thus, he is considered the first anti-invasion hero of the Vietnamese. Some researchers believe he is the Vietnamese version of Vaiśravaṇa.

The folk hero was a popular subject for poets, such as Cao Bá Quát who wrote an epic poem to Thánh Gióng in the 19th century. Today Thánh Gióng features with other legendary figures such as Kinh Dương Vương, Âu Cơ, Sơn Tinh – Thủy Tinh, in elementary school texts.

== Legends ==
There are many versions of the legend of Thánh Gióng. But they all have the same general story: In ancient time, there was a fearsome enemy, the king sent his men to seek for a talented person to defeat the enemy. In Phù Đổng village, there was a child, though being three years old, he was incapable of speech or crawl. But as soon as he heard about the king seeking for talent, he spoke. He then joined the army, asked the king for a sword and an iron horse, and defeated the enemy. After peace was restored, he flew away.

=== Việt Điện U Linh Tập ===
In Việt Điện U Linh Tập, Thánh Gióng is known as Sóc Thiên Vương (chữ Hán: 朔天王). This version does not specify when the story was set nor who was the enemy. It says in the old days, there was an enemy in the country, the king ordered his emissaries to find someone who can defeat the enemy. The Heavenly King (Vietnamese: Thiên Vương, which is what Thánh Gióng is called in the story) was a baby at the time. Having heard the news, he told his mother to prepare a lot of food for him. A few months later, he grew into a big man and joined the army. The emissary brought him to the capital. The king was very happy and asked him what he wanted, to which the Heavenly King asked for a long sword and an iron horse. The king accepted. The Heavenly King drew his sword and rode his horse into battle. Once he defeated the enemy and restored peace in the country, he rode his horse to Vệ Linh mountain, climbed onto a banyan tree and fly away. The people erected a temple to worship him. The Lý dynasty also erected a temple dedicated to him in Cảo Hương village near West Lake.

Thiền uyển tập anh has a follow-up to the story: In the Early Lê dynasty, Buddhist monk Khuông Việt travelled to Vệ Linh mountain and wanted to build a house there. That night, he dreamt of a deity who wore gold armor, carried a golden spear in his left hand and a tower in his right hand, followed by more than ten people. The deity said:

I am Vaiśravaṇa (chữ Hán: 毗沙門天王, Vietnamese: Tì Sa Môn Thiên Vương), my escorts are all Yaksa. The Heavenly Emperor sent me to this country to help the people, you are blessed to be able to talk to me.

The monk woke up and heard loud cries in the mountain. The next day, he found a large unusual tree in the mountains, he cut it down and built a temple. In 891, the Song dynasty invaded, emperor Lê Hoàn told Buddhist monks to pray at the temple. The Song army at Tây Kết village suddenly retreat to Chi river, they then met with a large storm and withdrew back to China. Lê Hoàn built more temple to Tì Sa Môn Thiên Vương.

=== Lĩnh Nam chích quái ===
In Hùng King's time, the country was peaceful. The king of Ân planned an invasion under the pretext of punishing Hùng King for not paying tribute. Hùng King asked his men for a way to fight back, one of them suggested asking the dragon king to fight the invaders on their behalf. The king held a large prayer, and suddenly there was heavy rain and an old man appeared. Finding the man to be unusual, the king asked him how to fight the invader. The old man predicted that the enemy will invade in three years, and to fight back, the king must "forge weapons, train soldiers, and find talents in the country. Those who defeat the enemy will be rewarded with land and title." The old man flew away, the king realized that he is the dragon king.

Three years later, the Ân invaded, the king followed the dragon king's advice and sought for talented man. In Phù Đổng village, there was a 60-year-old rich man who had a son. This child was already 3 years old, yet he couldn't talk or sit. When the king's emissary arrived to his village, his mom jokingly said that she "gave birth to this child who only knows how to eat" and that "he doesn't know how to fight the enemy to receive the reward and repay his parents." The child suddenly spoke and told his mother to "invite the emissary so that you may hear what he has to say". The emissary arrived and asked the child what he wanted, the child said the emissary should tell the king to "forge an iron horse 18 thước high, an iron sword 7 thước long and an iron helmet." The child then grew up very fast. When Ân army arrived at Trâu mountain, the child, now a 10 trượng tall man, stood up. He drew his sword and proclaimed that he was "a general from heaven", he wore his helmet, rode on his horse and engage the enemy. The enemy was defeated, the king of Ân was killed. The man went to Sóc mountain and flew away with his horse. Hùng King bestowed upon him the title of Heavenly King of Phù Đổng (chữ Hán: 扶董天王, Vietnamese: Phù Đổng Thiên Vương). Since then, the Ân dynasty didn't dare to invade Hùng king anymore, and the surrounding country respected him more. The Lý dynasty titled him Xung Thiên Thần Vương (chữ Hán: 冲天神王).

=== Đại Việt sử ký toàn thư ===
In the 6th generation of King Hùng, there was a rich man in Phù Đổng village, Vũ Ninh division, who gave birth to a son. The child was three years old but couldn't talk or laugh. At time, there were an emergency in the country, the king ordered to find someone who can defeat the enemy. That day, the child suddenly spoke, told his mother to invite the emissary in and said he wanted "a sword and a horse, the king doesn’t need to worry." The little child rode his horse in the front, the soldiers followed behind. They defeated the enemy at Vũ Ninh mountain. The enemy called the child general from heaven and came to surrender. The child rode his horse into the sky and went away. The king ordered to renovate his house into a temple and worshiped him.

=== Version collected by Nguyễn Đổng Chi ===
This version is the most well-known version today. It is similar to Lĩnh Nam chích quái's version. However, in this version Phù Đổng Thiên Vương has a name, Gióng. Instead of a rich man, his parent was an old woman who lived alone and became pregnant after stepping on to a giant footprint that trampled her field. It also has more dialogues and details such as: the horse in this version can spit fire, the swords and armors are so heavy only Gióng can carry them. During the battle, Gióng's sword broke and he had to use bamboo instead.

== Legacy ==
=== Memorial ===
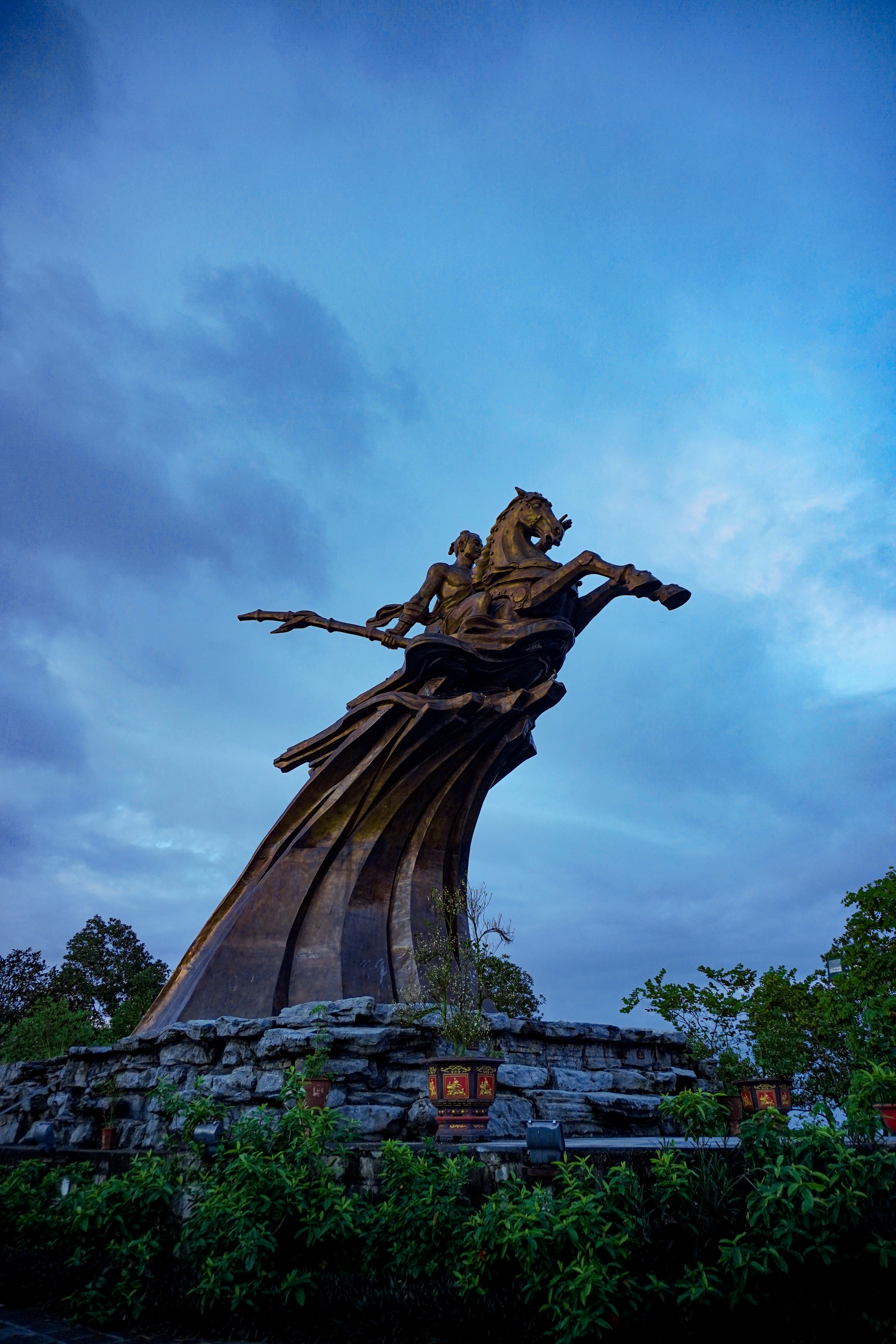
Thánh Gióng monument

The Gióng Festival has been held since the defeat against the Shang, and it officially became a national holiday in the 11th century during the dynasty of Emperor of Lý Thái Tổ, the founder of the Lý dynasty.

A large bronze statue of Thánh Gióng in full armor riding his horse jumping up towards the sky can be seen near Sóc Sơn 30 km north of Hanoi.

=== Heritage ===
- In 2010, UNESCO has listed Thanh Giong in Intangible Cultural Heritage in Need of Urgent Safeguarding
- UNESCO officially recognized Saint Giong festival as a world intangible cultural heritage of humanity at 10:20 pm in Indochina time zone.

=== Giong Festival ===
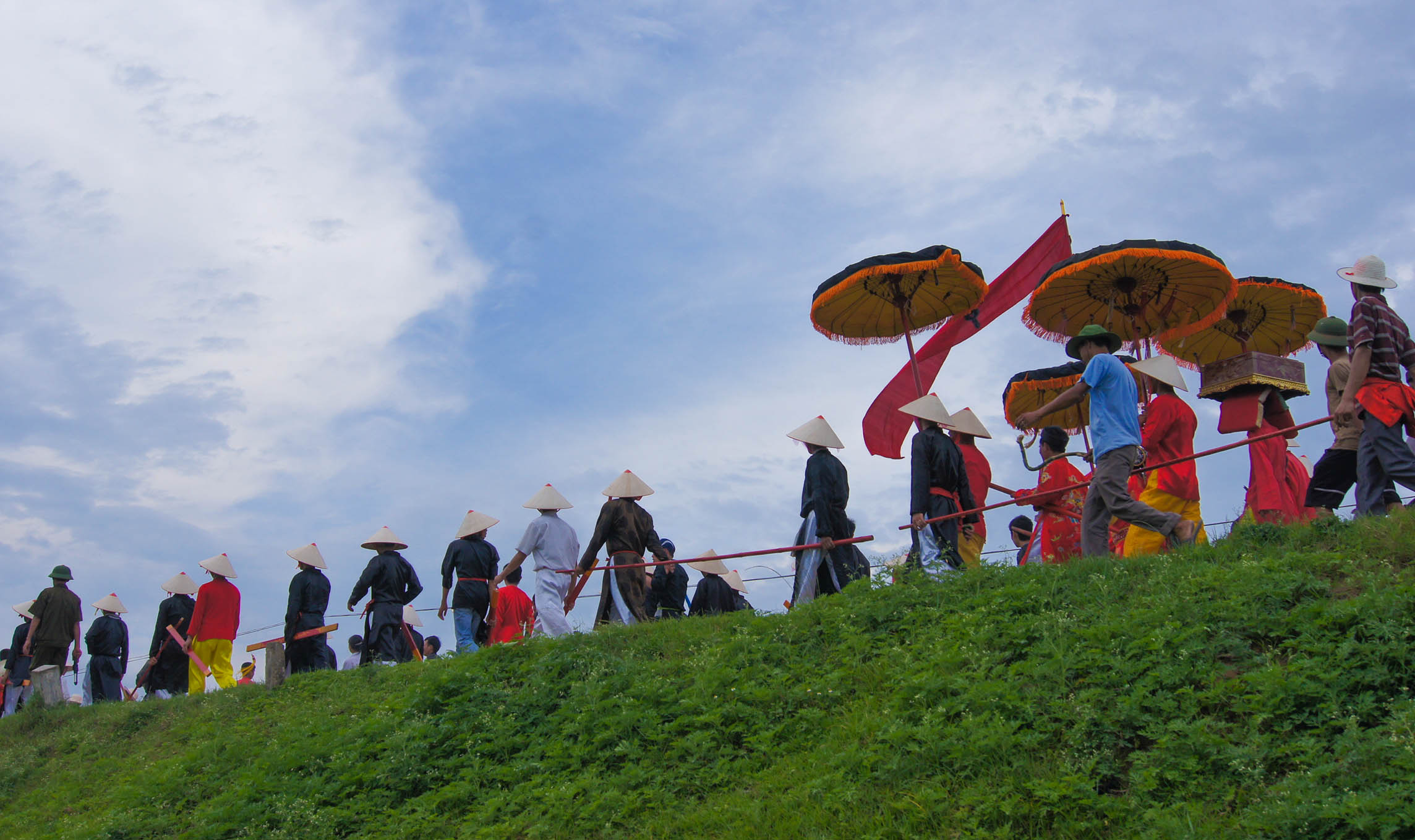
Thánh Gióng palanquin procession in Gióng Festival

Usually celebrated at Phù Đổng village, Gia Lâm District, Hanoi on the 4th day of the Fourth month of Vietnamese calendar every year. The Celebration tributes the hero who saved the country that stood against the army invaders. People have to prepare their performance for this festival from 1 st of third lunar to 5th fourth lunar month. On the 6th of the Fourth lunar month, the festival begins with the ceremony of praying for the weather. On the 7th day of the fourth lunar month, villagers bring trays of vegetarian food to recreate the moment villagers who contributed food to Thánh Gióng. The festival continues the ritual until 12th day of the Fourth lunar month.
