= Four Immortals =

Four guardian gods for the country of Vietnam

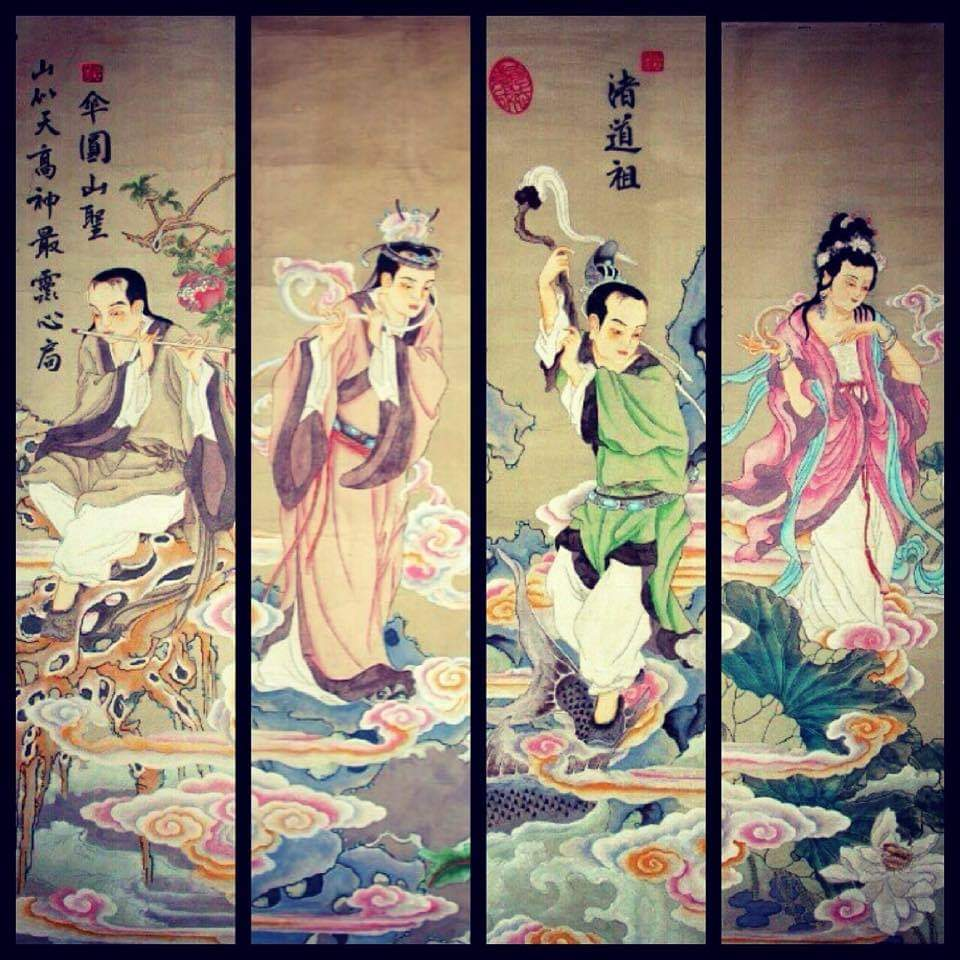
- Painting of The Four Immortals. From left to right: Tản Viên Sơn Thánh, Phù Đổng Thiên Vương, Chử Đạo Tổ and Liễu Hạnh Công Chúa
- Vietnamese alphabet: Tứ bất tử
- Chữ Hán: 四不死

The Four Immortals (Vietnamese: Tứ bất tử, chữ Hán: 四不死) refers to the four chief figures in the pantheon of genii worshiped by the Vietnamese people of the Red River Delta region in legend and mythology. They are Tản Viên Sơn Thánh (chữ Hán: 傘圓山聖), also known as Sơn Tinh (山精) the god of Tản Viên Mountain, Phù Đổng Thiên Vương (扶董天王, also known as Thánh Gióng, Ông Dóng) a giant who defeated northern invaders, Chử Đồng Tử (褚童子) a sage, and Princess Liễu Hạnh (柳杏公主), a heavenly spirit and Mother Goddess.

Full development of the mythology and honouring of the Four Immortals took place in the Lê dynasty. Each of the four immortals has association with helping historical national figures. For example, Thánh Gióng in legend helped the sixth Hùng King to repulse foreign invaders.
