= Regional forms of shamanism =

Shamanism around the world

Shamanism is a religious practice present in various cultures and religions around the world. Shamanism takes on many different forms, which vary greatly by region and culture and are shaped by the distinct histories of its practitioners.

== Eurasia ==
=== China ===
Wuism (Chinese: 巫教; pinyin: wū jiào; lit. 'wu religion', 'shamanism', 'witchcraft'; alternatively 巫觋宗教 wū xí zōngjiào), refers to the shamanic practices of China. Its features are especially connected to the ancient Neolithic cultures such as the Hongshan culture. Chinese shamanic traditions are intrinsic to Chinese folk religion.

Shamanism also persists among various ethnic minorities in China, such as the Manchu, Mongol, Tibetan, Miao, Naxi and Pumi peoples.

=== Hmong ===
The Hmong people are an ethnic group of people originating from Central China, who continue to maintain and practice Ua Neeb. Being a Hmong shaman is a vocation; their primary role is to bring harmony to the individual, their family, and their community within their environment by performing rituals, usually through trance.

The Hmong believe that all things on Earth have a soul (or multiple souls), each considered equal and possibly interchangeable. Animal sacrifice is central to these beliefs, where it is seen as a necessary request to borrow the animal's soul to heal a person's affliction or to save their soul from being captured by a wild spirit for a period of 12 months. During the Hmong New Year, the shaman performs a special ritual to release the animal's soul to a spiritual dimension. As part of its service to mankind, the animal's soul is understood to be reincarnated into a 'higher animal,' possibly becoming a member of a god's family (ua Fuab Tais Ntuj tus tub, tus ntxhais) to live a life of luxury, free of suffering as an animal. Hence, participating in this exchange by being sacrificed is one of the greatest honors for the animal.

Animal sacrifice has been part of the Hmong shamanic practice for the past 5,000 years. After the Vietnam War, over 200,000 Hmong were resettled in the United States and shamanism is still part of the Hmong culture. Before the sacred cockfight, The Hmong of south-east Guizhou cover a rooster with a piece of red cloth and then hold it up to worship and sacrifice to the Heaven and the Earth. In a 2010 trial of a Hmong from Sheboygan, Wisconsin charged with staging a cockfight, it was stated that the roosters were "kept for both food and religious purposes", and the case ended in an acquittal.

In addition to the spiritual dimension, Hmong shamans attempt to treat many physical illnesses through the use of the text of sacred words (khawv koob).

=== Japan ===
Shamanism is part of the indigenous Ainu religion and the Japanese religion of Shinto. Since the early middle-ages Shinto has been influenced by and syncretized with Buddhism and other elements of continental East Eurasian culture. The book "Occult Japan: Shinto, Shamanism and the Way of the Gods" by Percival Lowell delves further into researching Japanese shamanism or Shintoism. The book Japan Through the Looking Glass: Shaman to Shinto uncovers the extraordinary aspects of Japanese beliefs.

=== Korea ===
Shamanism is still practiced in North and South Korea. In the south, shaman women are known as mudangs, while male shamans are referred to as baksoo mudangs. A person can become a shaman through either a hereditary title or natural ability. In contemporary society, shamans are consulted for financial and marital decisions.

=== Malaysia ===
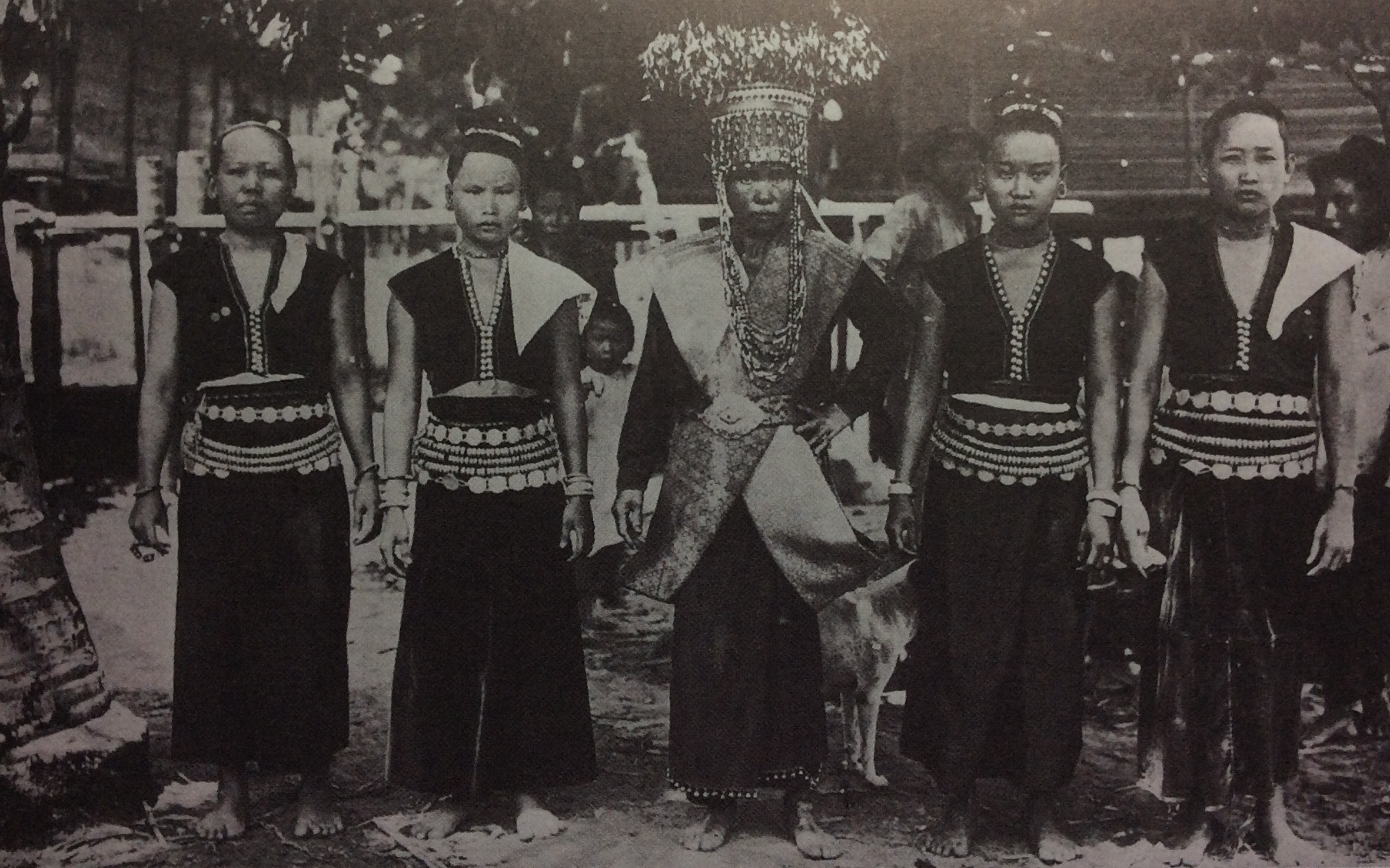
Bobohizan of Sabah, c. 1921.

Shamanism is also practiced among the Malay community in Malay Peninsula and indigenous people in Sabah and Sarawak. People who practice shamanism in the country are generally called bomoh, and analogously pawang on the Peninsula. In Sabah, the Bobohizan is the main shaman among the Kadazan-Dusun indigenous community.

=== Mongolia ===
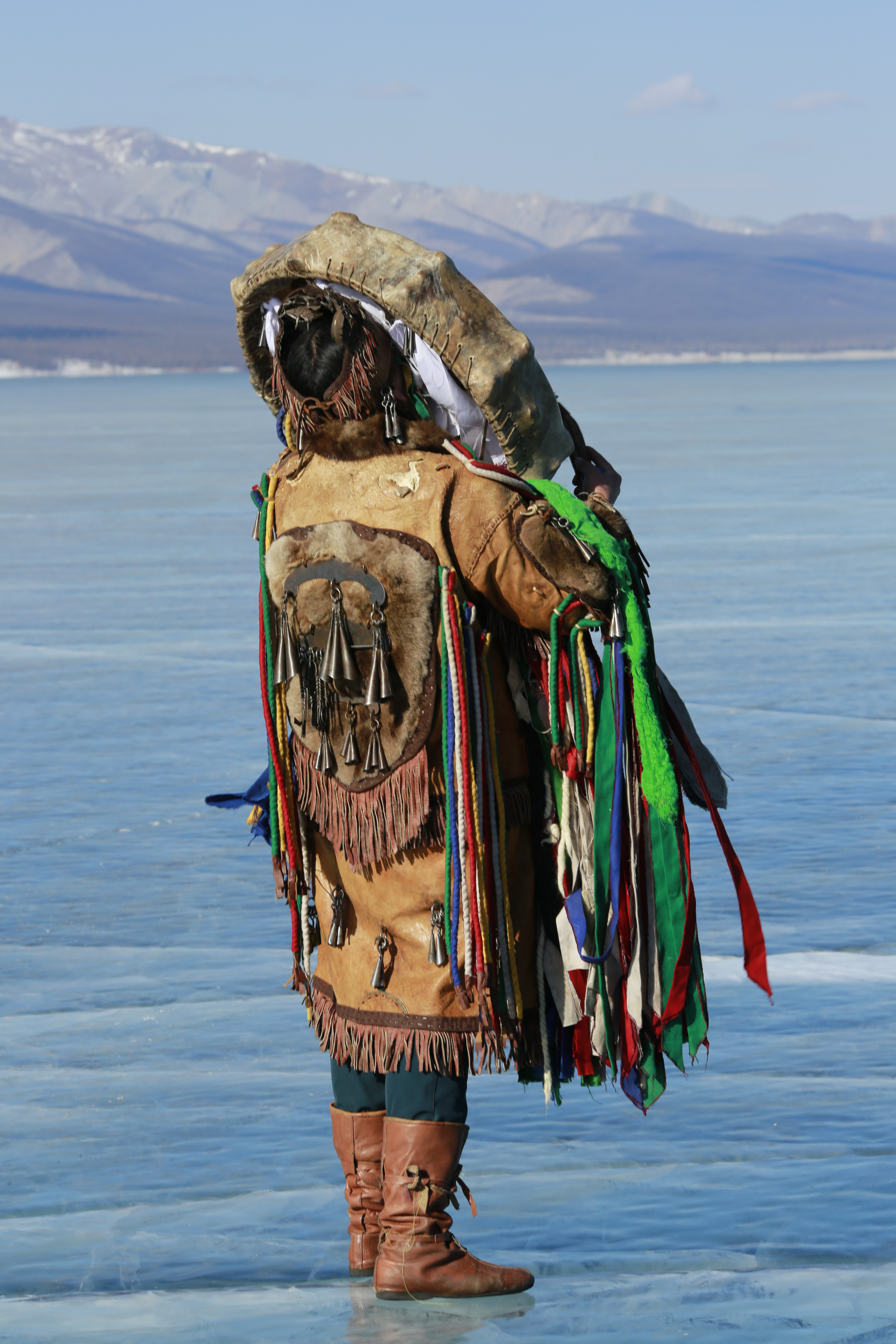
Mongolian Shaman performing rituals, 3 March 2019. At Khovsogol lake worship, during the "Blue Pearl" event in Mongolia

Mongolian classics, such as The Secret History of the Mongols, provide details about male and female shamans serving as exorcists, healers, rainmakers, oneiromancers, soothsayers, and officials. Shamanic practices continue in present-day Mongolian culture.

The spiritual hierarchy in clan-based Mongolian society was complex. The highest group consisted of 99 tngri (55 of them benevolent or "white" and 44 terrifying or "black"), 77 natigai or "earth-mothers", besides others. The tngri were called upon only by leaders and great shamans and were common to all the clans. After these, three groups of ancestral spirits dominated. The "Lord-Spirits" were the souls of clan leaders to whom any member of a clan could appeal for physical or spiritual help. The "Protector-Spirits" included the souls of great shamans (ĵigari) and shamanesses (abĵiya). The "Guardian-Spirits" were made up of the souls of smaller shamans (böge) and shamanesses (idugan) and were associated with a specific locality (including mountains, rivers, etc.) in the clan's territory.

In the 1990s, a form of Mongolian neo-shamanism was created which has taken a modern approach to shamanism. Among the Buryat Mongols, who live in Mongolia and Russia, the proliferation of shamans since 1990 is a core aspect of a larger struggle for the Buryats to reestablish their historical and genetic roots, as has been documented extensively by Ippei Shimamura, an anthropologist at the University of Shiga Prefecture in Japan. Some Mongolian shamans are now making a business out of their profession and even have offices in the larger towns. At these businesses, a shaman generally heads the organization and performs services such as healing, fortunetelling, and solving all kinds of problems. Although the initial enthusiasm for the revival of Mongol shamanism in the post-communist/post-1990 era led to an openness to all interested visitors, the situation has changed among those Mongols seeking to protect the essential ethnic or national basis of their practices. In recent years many associations of Mongol shamans have become wary of Western "core" or "neo" or "New Age" shamans and have restricted access to only to Mongols and Western scholars

=== Philippines ===
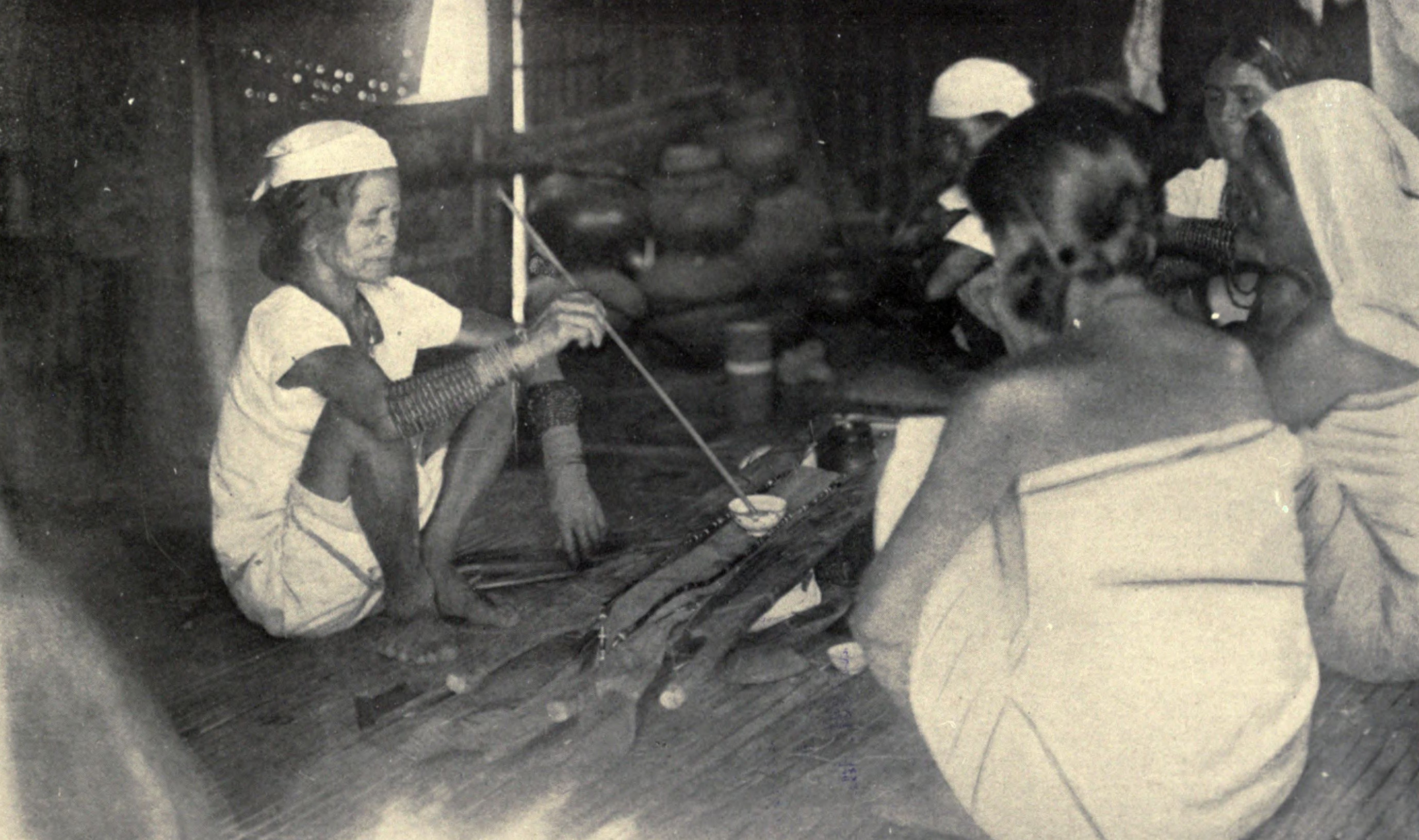
1922: a shaman of the Itneg people renewing an offering to the spirit (anito) of a warrior's kalasag shield

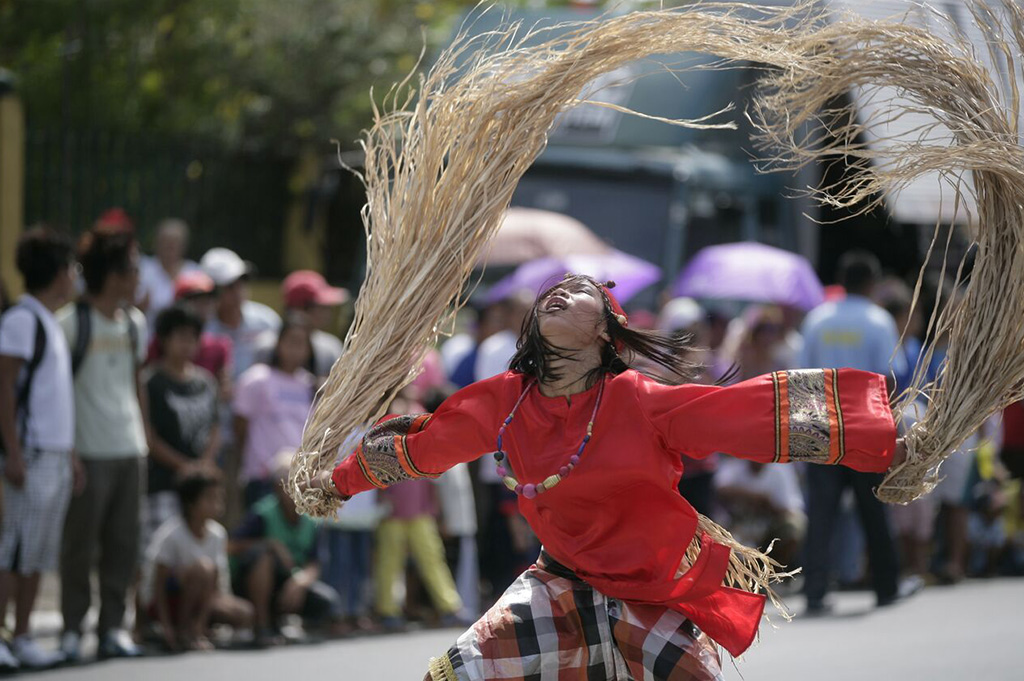
A performer depicting a shaman in a recent Babaylan Festival of Bago, Negros Occidental.

Babaylans (also balian or katalonan, among many other indigenous names) were shamans of the various ethnic groups of the pre-colonial Philippine islands. These shamans specialized in harnessing the unlimited powers of nature and were almost always women or feminized men (asog or bayok). They were believed to have spirit guides, by which they could contact and interact with the spirits and deities (anito or diwata) and the spirit world. Their primary role were as mediums during pag-anito séance rituals. There were also various subtypes of babaylan specializing in the arts of healing and herbalism, divination, and sorcery.

Babaylan were highly respected members of the community, on par with the pre-colonial noble class. In the absence of the datu (head of the domain), the babaylan takes in the role of interim head of the domain.

They were powerful ritual specialists with the capability to influence the weather, and tap the various spirits in nature. Babaylans were held in such high esteem because of their ability to negate the dark magic of an evil datu or spirit and heal the sick or the wounded. Among the powers of the babaylan was to heal the sick, ensure a safe pregnancy and child birth, and lead rituals with offerings to the various divinities. The babaylans were well versed in herb lore, and was able to create remedies, antidotes, and potions from various roots and seeds. They used these to treat the sick or to aid an ally datu in bringing down an enemy, hence, the babaylans were also known for their specialization in medical and divine combat.

Their influence waned when most of the ethnic groups of the Philippines were gradually converted to Islam or Catholicism. Under the Spanish Empire, babaylan were often maligned and falsely accused as witches and "priests of the devil" and were persecuted harshly by the Spanish clergy. The Spanish burned down everything they associated as connected to the native people's indigenous religion (including shrines such as the dambana), even forcefully ordering native children to defecate on their own god's idols. In modern Philippine society, their roles have largely been taken over by folk healers, which are now predominantly male, while some are still being falsely accused as 'witches', which has been inputted by Spanish colonialism. In areas where the people have not been converted into Muslims or Christians, notably ancestral domains of indigenous peoples, the shamans and their cultural traits have continued to exist with their respective communities, although these shamans and their practices are being slowly diluted by Christian religions which continue to interfere with their life-ways.

=== Siberia and North Eurasia ===
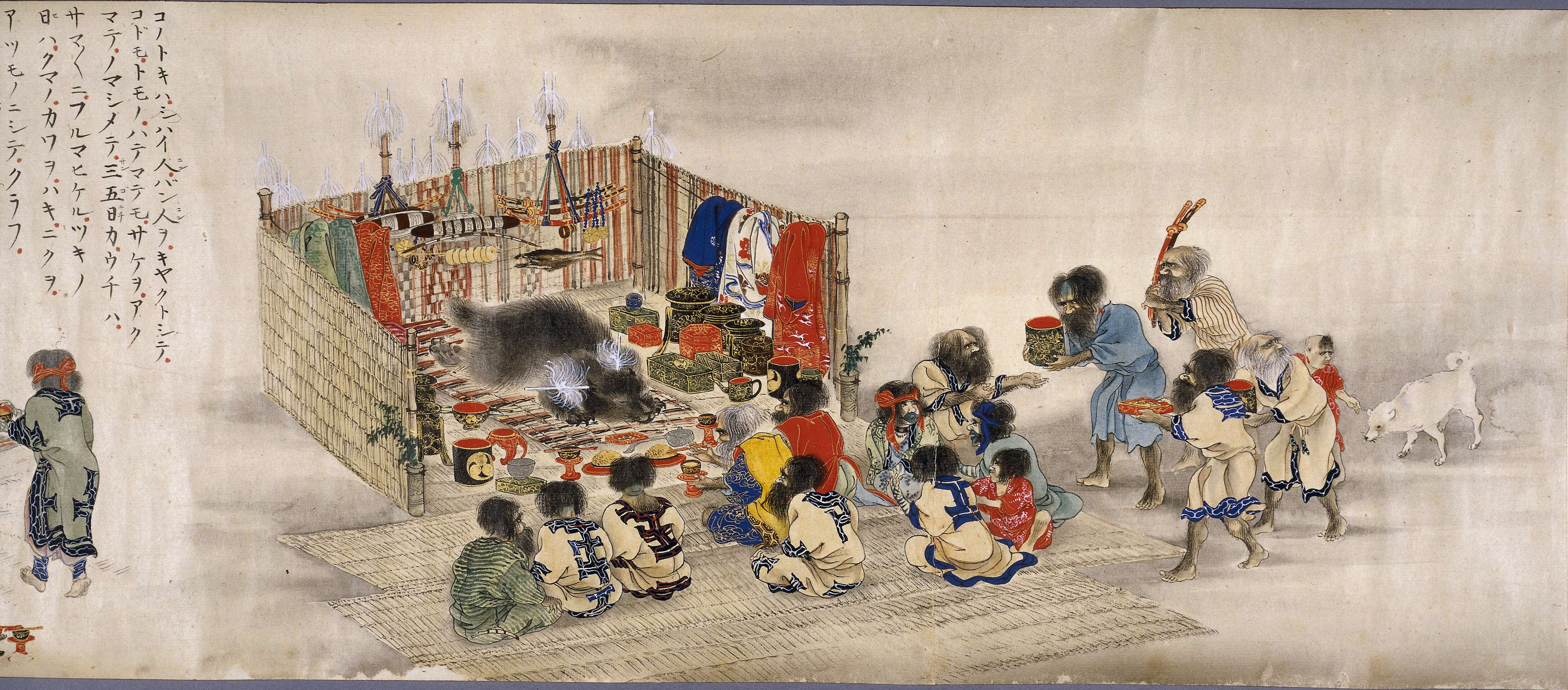
Ainu bear sacrifice. Japanese scroll painting, circa 1870.

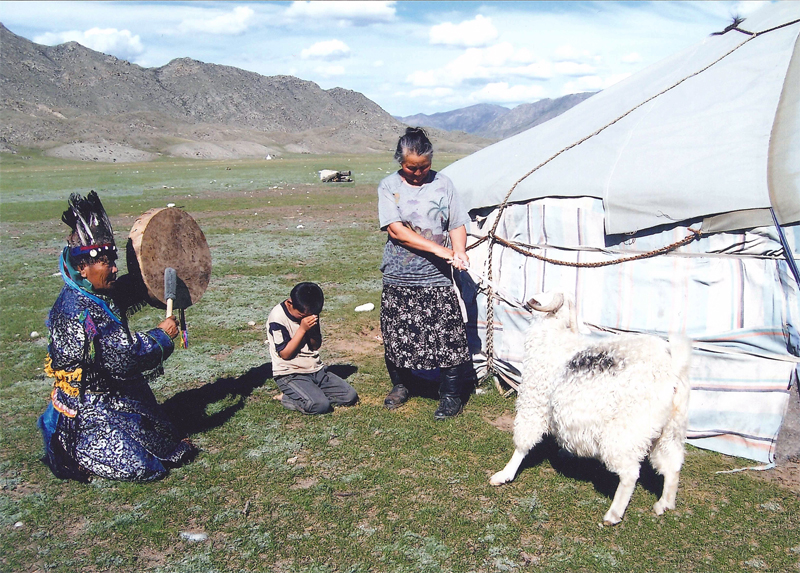
Shaman in southern Siberia, 2014

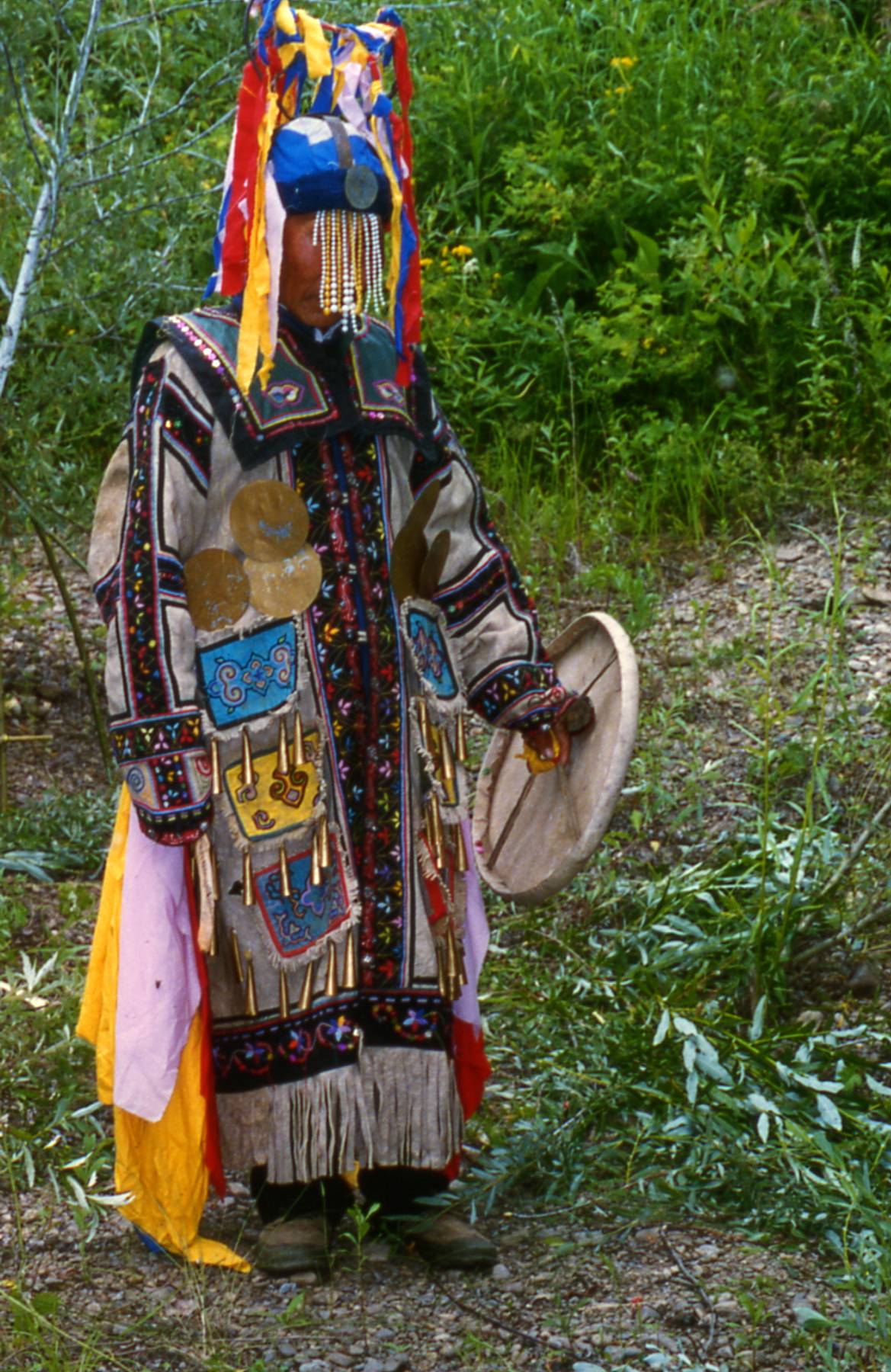
Oroqen shaman, northern China

Siberia is regarded as the locus classicus of shamanism. The area is inhabited by many different ethnic groups, and many of its peoples observe shamanistic practices. Many classical ethnographic sources of "shamanism" were recorded among Siberian peoples.

Manchu Shamanism is one of very few Shamanist traditions which held official status into the modern era, by becoming one of the imperial cults of the Qing dynasty of China (alongside Buddhism, Taoism and traditional Heaven worship). The Palace of Earthly Tranquility, one of the principal halls of the Forbidden City in Beijing, was partly dedicated to Shamanistic rituals. The ritual set-up is still preserved in situ today.

Among the Siberian Chukchis peoples, a shaman is interpreted as someone who is possessed by a spirit, who demands that someone assume the shamanic role for their people. Among the Buryat, there is a ritual known as shanar whereby a candidate is consecrated as shaman by another, already-established shaman.

Among several Samoyedic peoples, shamanism was a living tradition also in modern times, especially at groups living in isolation, until recent times (Nganasans). The last notable Nganasan shaman's seances could be recorded on film in the 1970s.

When the People's Republic of China was formed in 1949 and the border with Russian Siberia was formally sealed, many nomadic Tungus groups (including the Evenki) that practiced shamanism were confined in Manchuria and Inner Mongolia. The last shaman of the Oroqen, Chuonnasuan (Meng Jinfu), died in October 2000.

In many other cases, shamanism was in decline even at the beginning of the 20th century, for instance, among the Roma.

=== Central Eurasia ===
==== Geographic influences on Central Eurasian shamanism ====
Geographical factors heavily influence the character and development of the religion, myths, rituals and epics of Central Eurasia. While in other parts of the world, religious rituals are primarily used to promote agricultural prosperity, here they were used to ensure success in hunting and breeding livestock. Animals are one of the most important elements of indigenous religion in Central Eurasia because of the role they play in the survival of the nomadic civilizations of the steppes as well as sedentary populations living on land not conducive to agriculture. Shamans wore animal skins and feathers and underwent transformations into animals during spiritual journeys. In addition, animals served as humans' guides, rescuers, ancestors, totems and sacrificial victims. As a religion of nature, shamanism throughout Central Eurasia held particular reverence for the relations between sky, earth and water and believed in the mystical importance of trees and mountains. Shamanism in Central Eurasia also places a strong emphasis on the opposition between summer and winter, corresponding to the huge differences in temperature common in the region. The harsh conditions and poverty caused by the extreme temperatures drove Central Eurasian nomads throughout history to pursue militaristic goals against their sedentary neighbors. This military background can be seen in the reverence for horses and warriors within many indigenous religions.

==== Shared practices and beliefs ====
Central Eurasian shamans served as sacred intermediaries between the human and spirit world. In this role they took on tasks such as healing, divination, appealing to ancestors, manipulating the elements, leading lost souls and officiating public religious rituals. The shamanic séance served as a public display of the shaman's journey to the spirit world and usually involved intense trances, drumming, dancing, chanting, elaborate costumes, miraculous displays of physical strength, and audience involvement. The goal of these séances ranged from recovering the lost soul of a sick patient and divining the future to controlling the weather and finding a lost person or thing. The use of sleight-of-hand tricks, ventriloquism, and hypnosis were common in these rituals but did not explain the more impressive feats and actual cures accomplished by shamans.

Shamans perform in a "state of ecstasy" deliberately induced by an effort of will. Reaching this altered state of consciousness required great mental exertion, concentration and strict self-discipline. Mental and physical preparation included long periods of silent meditation, fasting, and smoking. In this state, skilled shamans employ capabilities that the human organism cannot accomplish in the ordinary state. Shamans in ecstasy displayed unusual physical strength, the ability to withstand extreme temperatures, the bearing of stabbing and cutting without pain, and the heightened receptivity of the sense organs. Shamans made use of intoxicating substances and hallucinogens, especially mukhomor mushrooms and alcohol, as a means of hastening the attainment of ecstasy.

The use of purification by fire is an important element of the shamanic tradition dating back as early as the 6th century. People and things connected with the dead had to be purified by passing between fires. These purifications were complex exorcisms while others simply involved the act of literally walking between two fires while being blessed by the shaman. Shamans in literature and practice were also responsible for using special stones to manipulate weather. Rituals are performed with these stones to attract rain or repel snow, cold or wind. This "rain-stone" was used for many occasions including bringing an end to drought as well as producing hailstorms as a means of warfare. Despite distinctions between various types of shamans and specific traditions, there is a uniformity throughout the region manifested in the personal beliefs, objectives, rituals, symbols and the appearance of shamans.

==== Shamanic rituals as artistic performance ====
The shamanic ceremony is both a religious ceremony and an artistic performance. The dramatic displays are not to draw attention or to create a spectacle, but to lead the tribe in a solemn ritualistic process. Performances consist of four elements: dance, music, poetry and dramatic or mimetic action. The use of these elements serves the purpose of outwardly expressing his mystical communion with nature and the spirits for the rest of the tribe. The true shaman can make the journey to the spirit world at any time and any place, but shamanic ceremonies provide a way for the rest of the tribe to share in this religious experience. The shaman changes his voice mimetically to represent different persons, gods, and animals while his music and dance change to show his progress in the spirit world and his different spiritual interactions. Many shamans practice ventriloquism and make use of their ability to accurately imitate the sounds of animals, nature, humans and other noises in order to provide the audience with the ambiance of the journey. Elaborate dances and recitations of songs and poetry are used to make the shamans spiritual adventures into a matter of living reality to his audience.

==== Costume and accessories ====
The shaman's attire varies throughout the region but his chief accessories are his coat, cap, and tambourine or drum. The transformation into an animal is an important aspect of the journey into the spirit world undertaken during shamanic rituals so the coat is often decorated with birds feathers and representations of animals, coloured handkerchiefs, bells and metal ornaments. The cap is usually made from the skin of a bird with the feathers and sometimes head, still attached.

The drum or tambourine is the essential means of communicating with spirits and enabling the shaman to reach altered states of consciousness on his journey. The drum, representing the universe in epitome, is often divided into equal halves to represent the earth and lower realms. Symbols and natural objects are added to the drum representing natural forces and heavenly bodies.

==== Tsarist and Soviet Russia ====
In Soviet Central Eurasia, the Soviet government persecuted and denounced shamans as practitioners of fraudulent medicine and perpetuators of outdated religious beliefs in the new age of science and logic. The radical transformations occurring after the October Socialist Revolution led to a sharp decrease in the activity of shamans. Shamans represented an important component in the traditional culture of Central Eurasians and because of their important role in society, Soviet organizations and campaigns targeted shamans in their attempt to eradicate traditional influences in the lives of the indigenous peoples. Along with persecution under the tsarist and Soviet regimes, the spread of Christianity and Islam had a role in the disintegration of native faith throughout central Eurasia. Poverty, political instability and foreign influence are also detrimental to a religion that requires publicity and patronage to flourish. By the 1980s most shamans were discredited in the eyes of their people by Soviet officials and physicians.

=== Vietnam ===
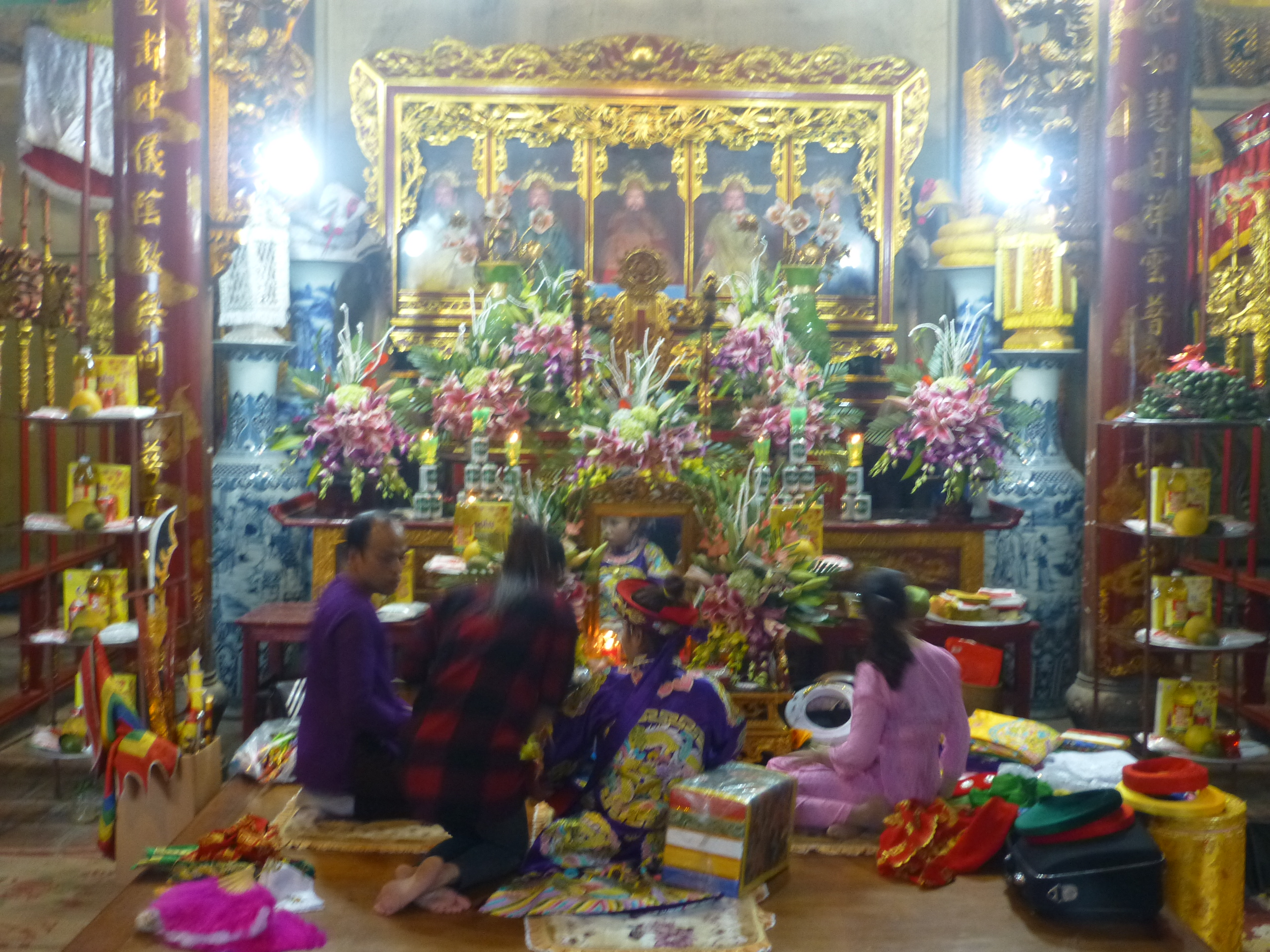
Lên đồng in Đông Cuông Temple, Vietnam. There are 12 times the đồng cốt (shaman) change clothing in a session of lên đồng, which means 12 times he/she change the character inside.

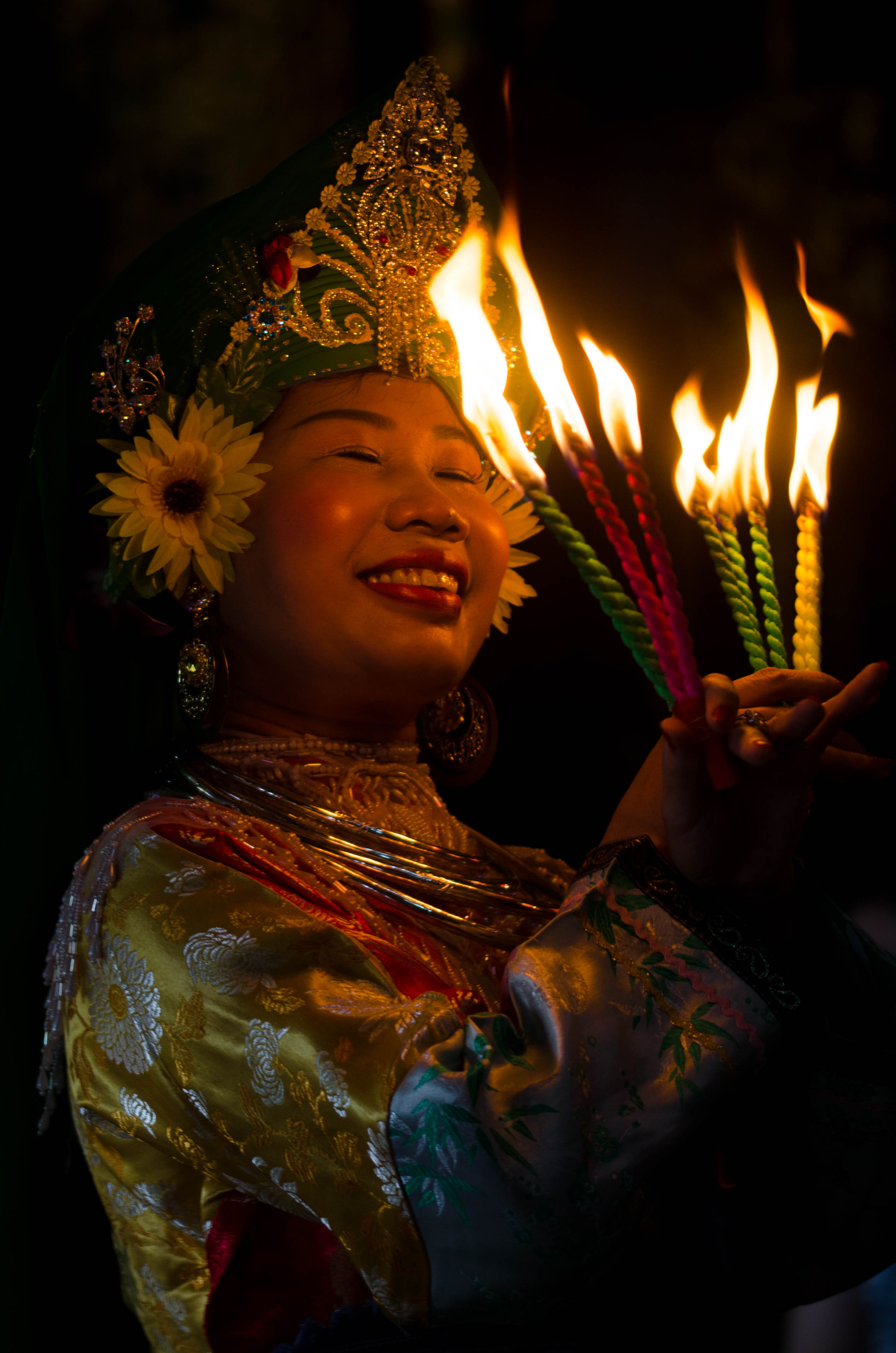
A đồng cốt is performing lên đồng.

In Vietnam, shamans conduct rituals in many of the religious traditions that co-mingle in the majority and minority populations. In their rituals, music, dance, special garments and offerings are part of the performance that surround the spirit journey.

Shamanism is a part of Vietnamese folk religion, three branches of shamanism are known today as Đạo Mẫu, Thánh Trần worship and Nội Đạo Tràng (of which the most famous is Đạo Mẫu). In Vietnam, this ritual practice is called lên đồng or also known as hầu bóng, or hầu đồng, sessions involve artistic elements such as music, singing, dance and the use of costumes.

Chầu văn, which is a traditional folk art of northern Vietnam, related to the Đạo Mẫu. The genre is famous for its use in rituals for deity mediumship. Chầu văn serves two purposes: to help hypnotize the medium for reception of the deities and to accompany the medium's actions with appropriate music.

=== India and Nepal ===
Theyyam or "theiyam" in Malayalam - a south Indian language - is the process by which a Priest invites a Hindu god or goddess to use his or her body as a medium or channel and answer other devotees' questions. The same is called "arulvaakku" or "arulvaak" in Tamil, another south Indian language - Adhiparasakthi Siddhar Peetam is famous for arulvakku in Tamil Nadu. The people in Coastal Karnataka and malenadu call the same, Buta Kola, "paathri" or "darshin"; in other parts of Karnataka, it is known by various names such as, "prashnaavali", "vaagdaana", "asei", "aashirvachana" and so on.

In Uttarakhand, Sudurpashchim Province of western Nepal and Himachal Pradesh a similar Shamanic ritual happens in villages and Hindu temples during the night it is called "Jagar" in Uttarakhand and "Gur" in Himachal Pradesh.

In Nepal and Sikkim, "dhaamee" or "Jhakri" are common names used for shamans. They exist in the Limbu, Sunuwar, Rai, Sherpa, Kami, Tamang, Gurung, Magar and Lepcha communities. They are influenced by Hinduism, Tibetan Buddhism, Mun and Bön rites.

In English, the closest translation for this position is "oracle." The Dalai Lama, who lives in exile in northern India, still consults an oracle known as the Nechung Oracle, which is considered the official state oracle of the government of Tibet. The Dalai Lama has, according to centuries-old custom, consulted the Nechung Oracle during the new year festivities of Losar.

=== Other Eurasian traditions ===
Shamanism is still widely practiced in the Ryukyu Islands (Okinawa, Japan), where shamans are known as 'Noro' (all women) and 'Yuta'. 'Noro' generally administer public or communal ceremonies while 'Yuta' focus on civil and private matters. Shamanism is also practiced in a few rural areas in Japan proper. It is commonly believed that the Shinto religion is the result of the transformation of a shamanistic tradition into a religion. Forms of practice vary somewhat in the several Ryukyu islands, so that there is, for example, a distinct Miyako shamanism.

Shamanist practices seem to have been preserved in the Catholic religious traditions of aborigines in Taiwan.

=== Western Eurasia ===
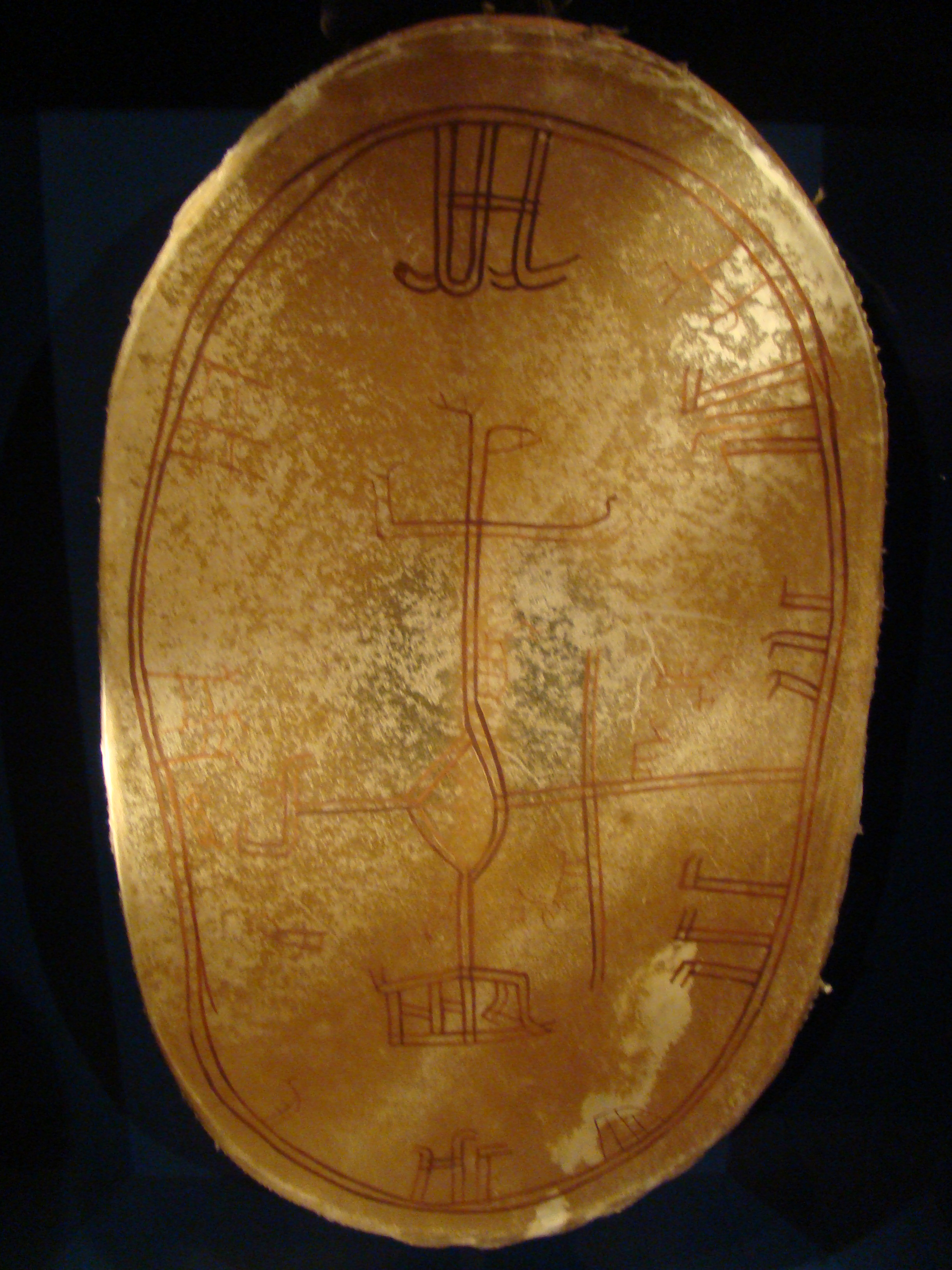
Sami shamanic drum in the Arktikum Science Museum, in Rovaniemi, Finland

Some of the prehistoric peoples who once lived in Siberia and other parts of Central and Eastern Eurasia have dispersed and migrated into other regions, bringing aspects of their cultures with them. For example, many Uralic peoples live now outside Siberia; however, the original location of the Proto-Uralic peoples (and its extent) is debated. Combined phytogeographical and linguistic considerations (distribution of various tree species and the presence of their names in various Uralic languages) suggest that this area was north of Central Ural Mountains and on lower and middle parts of Ob River. Newer studies suggest and origin in Northeast Eurasia. Proto-Uralic is suggested to be linked to the Chinese Liao civilization. The ancestors of Hungarian people or Magyars have wandered from their ancestral proto-Uralic area to the Pannonian Basin. Shamanism has played an important role in Turko-Mongol mythology: Tengriism—the major ancient belief among Xiongnu, Mongol and Turkic peoples, Magyars and Bulgars—incorporates elements of shamanism. Shamanism is no more a living practice among Hungarians, but remnants have been reserved as fragments of folklore, in folktales, customs.

Some historians of the Late Middle Ages and Early Modern period have argued that traces of shamanistic traditions can be seen in the popular folk belief of this period. Most prominent among these was the Italian Carlo Ginzburg, who claimed shamanistic elements in the benandanti custom of 16th-century Italy, the Hungarian Éva Pócs, who identified them in the táltos tradition of Hungary, and the Frenchman Claude Lecouteux, who has argued that Medieval traditions regarding the soul are based on earlier shamanic ideas. Ginzburg in particular has argued that some of these traditions influenced the conception of witchcraft in Christendom, in particular ideas regarding the witches' sabbath, leading to the events of the witch trials in the early modern period. Some of these Italian traditions survived into the 20th and early 21st centuries, allowing Italian-American sociologist Sabina Magliocco to make a brief study of them (2009).

Slavic Shamanism was widely practiced across the Slavic Pagan Tribes of Eastern Europe but the only living type of Shamanism still practiced that is not reconstructed is that of the Molfars of the Hutsul People. There are active attempts to reconstruct the practice and the practice is widely practiced among Rodnover communities. There are three known shamans in the modern hierarchy of Rodnovery being volkhv, guszlar, and vedmak.

- Libbrecht, Ulrich (2007). Within the Four Seas--: Introduction to Comparative Philosophy. Peeters Publishers. ISBN 978-90-429-1812-2.
- Nelson, Sarah M.; Matson, Rachel A.; Roberts, Rachel M.; Rock, Chris; Stencel, Robert E. (2006). Archaeoastronomical Evidence for Wuism at the Hongshan Site of Niuheliang. S2CID 6794721.
- Zhang, Hong; Hriskos, Constantine (June 2003). "Contemporary Chinese Shamanism:The Reinvention of Tradition". Cultural Survival Quarterly Magazine. 27 (2).

=== Celtic Shamanism ===
While specific shamanistic practices have long died out due to the Christianization of the Celtic nations, textual and literary evidence suggests that a kind of shamanism was common in early Celtic societies.

==== Wales ====
The introduction to Gwyneth Lewis and Rowan Williams's translation of The Book of Taliesin suggests that Welsh writers came to see the early medieval poet Taliesin as a sort of shamanic figure. The poetry ascribed to him in this collection shows how this figure not only channel other mystical entities (such as the Awen), but that the authors of these poems can channel Taliesin as they both create and perform the poems that they ascribe to Taliesin's persona. Shapeshifting and journeys to the Celtic Otherworld are among the common shamanistic practices in these poems.

== Circumpolar shamanism ==
=== Inuit and Yupik cultures ===
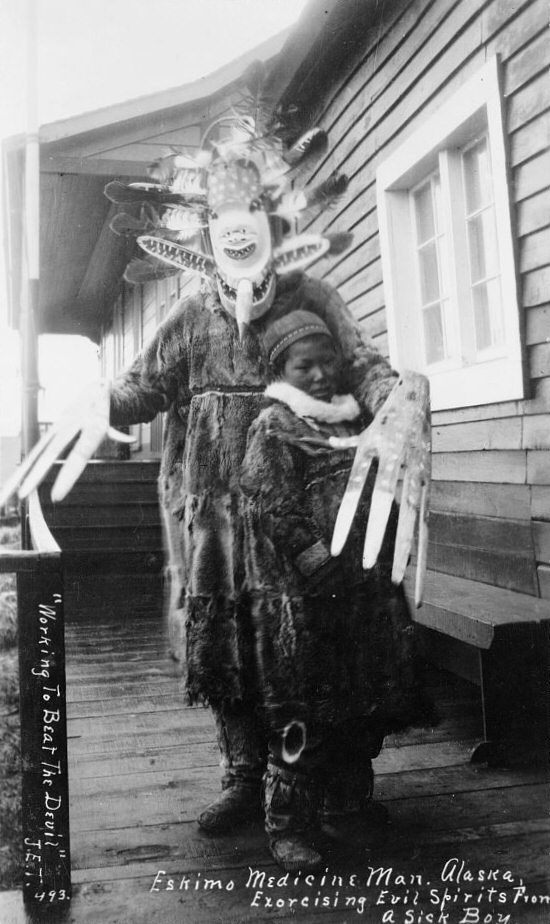
Yup'ik shaman exorcising evil spirits from a sick boy, Nushagak, Alaska, 1890s

Eskimo groups inhabit a huge area stretching from eastern Siberia through Alaska and Northern Canada (including Labrador Peninsula) to Greenland. Shamanistic practice and beliefs have been recorded at several parts of this vast area crosscutting continental borders.

The term "shamanism" can cover multiple characteristics of various different cultures. Mediation is regarded often as an important aspect of shamanism in general. Also in most Eskimo groups, the role of mediator is known well: the person filling it in is actually believed to be able to contact the beings who populate the belief system. The term "shaman" is used in several English-language publications also in relation to Eskimos. The word alignalghi (IPA: [aˈliɣnalʁi]) of the Eurasian Eskimos is translated as "shaman" in the Russian and English literature.

The belief system assumes specific links between the living people, the souls of hunted animals, and those of dead people. The soul concepts of several groups are specific examples of soul dualism (showing variability in details in the various cultures).

Unlike the majority of shamans the careers of most Eskimo shamans lack the motivation of force: becoming a shaman is usually seen as a result of deliberate consideration, not a necessity forced by the spirits.

=== Diversity ===
There are similarities in the cultures of the Eskimo groups together with diversity, far from homogeneity.

The Russian linguist Menovshikov (Меновщиков), an expert of Siberian Yupik and Sireniki Eskimo languages (while admitting that he is not a specialist in ethnology) mentions, that the shamanistic seances of those Siberian Yupik and Sireniki groups he has seen have many similarities to those of Greenland Inuit groups described by Fridtjof Nansen, although a large distance separates Siberia and Greenland. There may be certain similarities also in Eurasiatic groups with North American ones. Also the usage of a specific shaman's language is documented among several Eskimo groups, used mostly for talking to spirits. Also the Ungazighmiit (belonging to Siberian Yupiks) had a special allegoric usage of some expressions.

The local cultures showed great diversity. The myths concerning the role of shaman had several variants, and also the name of their protagonists varied from culture to culture. For example, a mythological figure, usually referred to in the literature by the collective term Sea Woman, has factually many local names: Nerrivik "meat dish" among Polar Inuit, Nuliayuk "lubricous" among Netsilingmiut, Sedna "the nether one" among Baffin Land Inuit. Also the soul conceptions, e.g. the details of the soul dualism showed great variability, ranging from guardianship to a kind of reincarnation. Conceptions of spirits or other beings had also many variants.

== Americas ==
=== North America ===
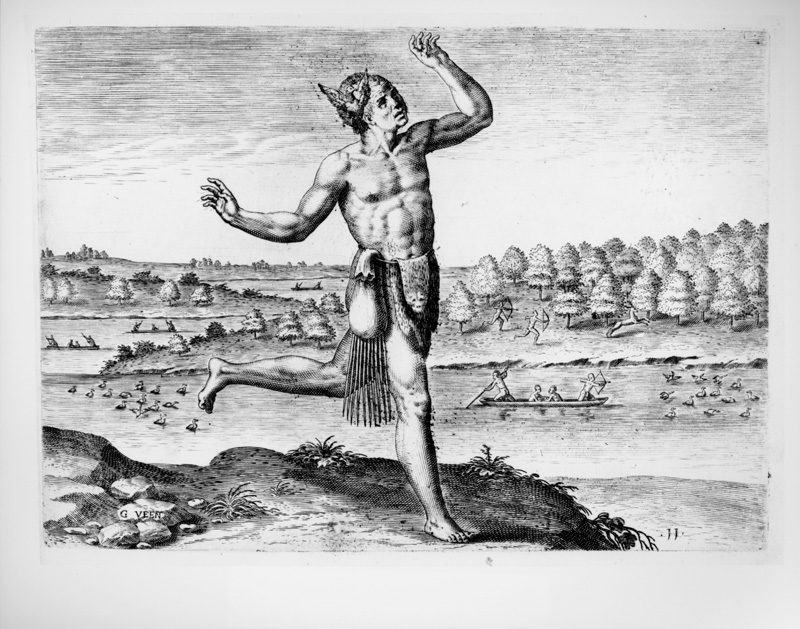
Native American "conjuror" in a 1590 colonial engraving

Although many Native American and First Nations cultures have traditional healers, singers, mystics, lore-keepers and medicine people, none of them ever used, or use, the term "shaman" to describe these religious leaders. Rather, like other Indigenous peoples, their spiritual functionaries are described by words in their own languages.

Many of these Indigenous religions have been misrepresented by outside observers and anthropologists. Often these accounts suffer from "noble savage"–type romanticism and racism, meaning that popular understanding of their practices is often inaccurate. Not all Indigenous communities have roles for specific individuals who mediate with the spirit world on behalf of the community. Among those that do have this sort of religious structure, spiritual methods and beliefs may have some commonalities, though many of these commonalities are due to some nations being closely related, from the same region, or through post-Colonial governmental policies leading to the combining of formerly independent nations on reservations. This can sometimes lead to the impression that there is more unity among belief systems than there was in antiquity.

With the arrival of European settlers and colonial administration, the practice of Native American traditional beliefs was suppressed in favor of Christianity. From the colonial era, up until the passage of the American Indian Religious Freedom Act in 1978, it was illegal for Indigenous people to practice traditional religion and sacred ceremonies. In most communities, the traditions were not completely eradicated, but rather went underground and were practiced secretly until the prohibitive laws were repealed, or were syncretized with Christianity, retaining some aspects of traditional beliefs and practices and combining them with Christian ones . Up until and during the last hundred years, thousands of Native American and First Nations children from different communities were sent into the Canadian Indian residential school system and Indian boarding schools in an effort to eradicate tribal languages, cultures and beliefs. This led to further decline in the number of Indigenous people practicing traditional religion and medicine. Canadian laws enacted in 1982, and henceforth, have attempted to reverse previous attempts at extinguishing Native culture.

=== Mesoamerica ===
==== Otomi ====
In Otomi Culture, the ritual specialist is called Badi.

==== Nahua ====
Among Nahua people, there used to be over 48 Ritual specialists, the most popular are called Graniceros (also Tiemperos, Tlamatini, Teciuhtlazque, Quiacazcli) who are usually stuck by lightning and take the role of asking for rain or taking the hail away from the crops. They also can perform healing.

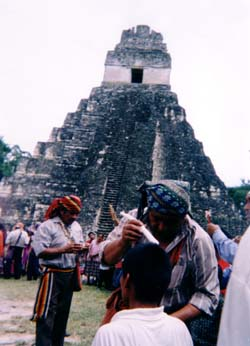
Maya priest performing a healing ritual at Tikal

=== South America ===
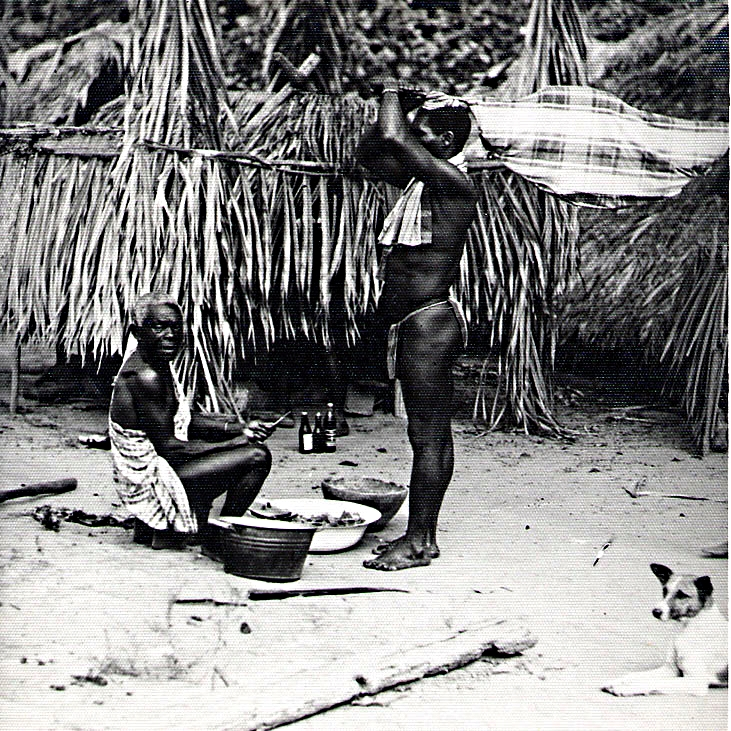
Body of Ndyuka Maroon child brought before a medicine man, Suriname River, Suriname, South America

- The Urarina of the Peruvian Amazon have an elaborate cosmological system predicated on the ritual consumption of ayahuasca, which is a key feature of their society.
- Santo Daime and União do Vegetal ( abbreviated to UDV) are syncretic religions with which use an entheogen called ayahuasca in an attempt to connect with the spirit realm and receive divine guidance.

==== Amazonia ====
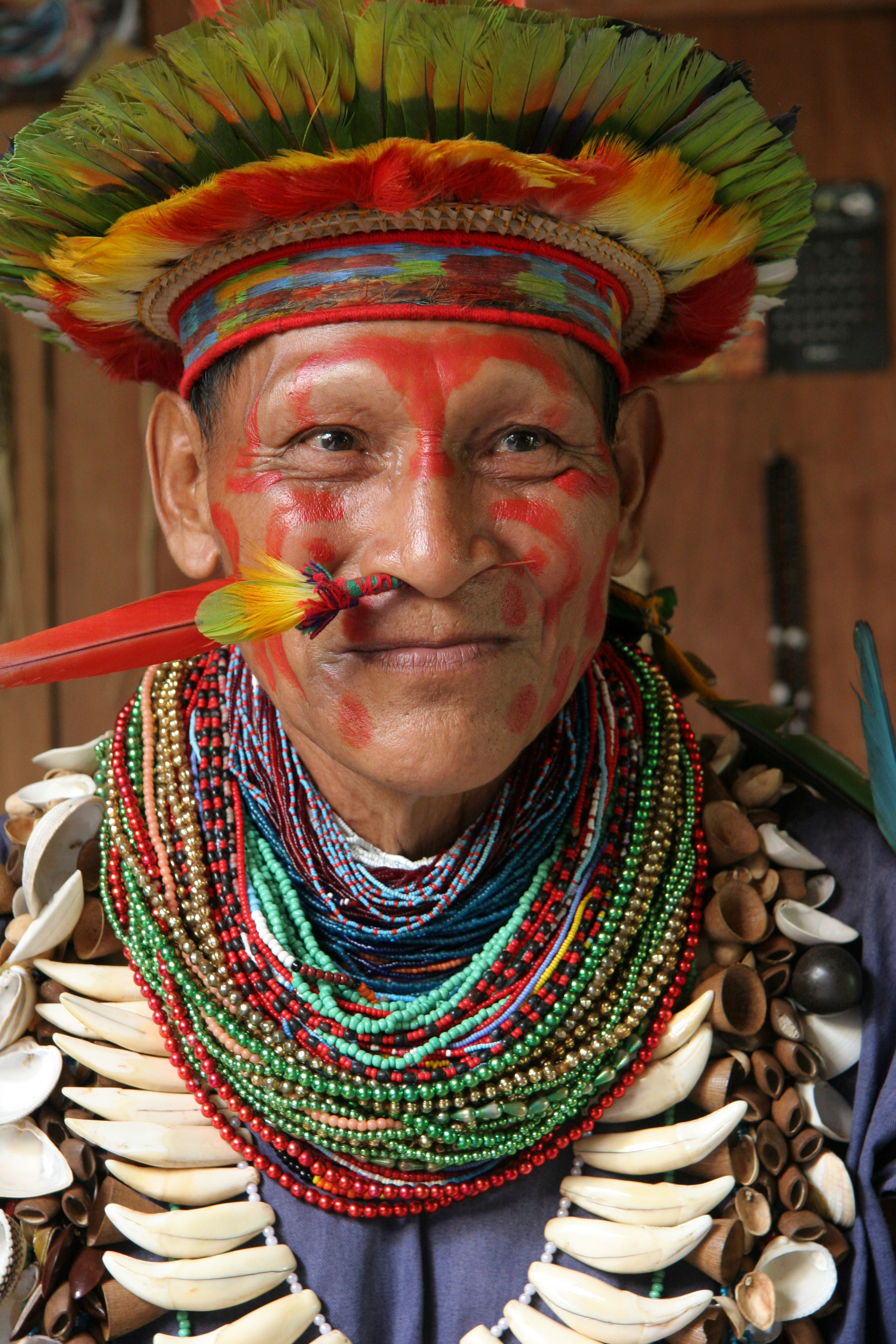
A Shuara shaman in Ecuador Amazonian forest, 2006

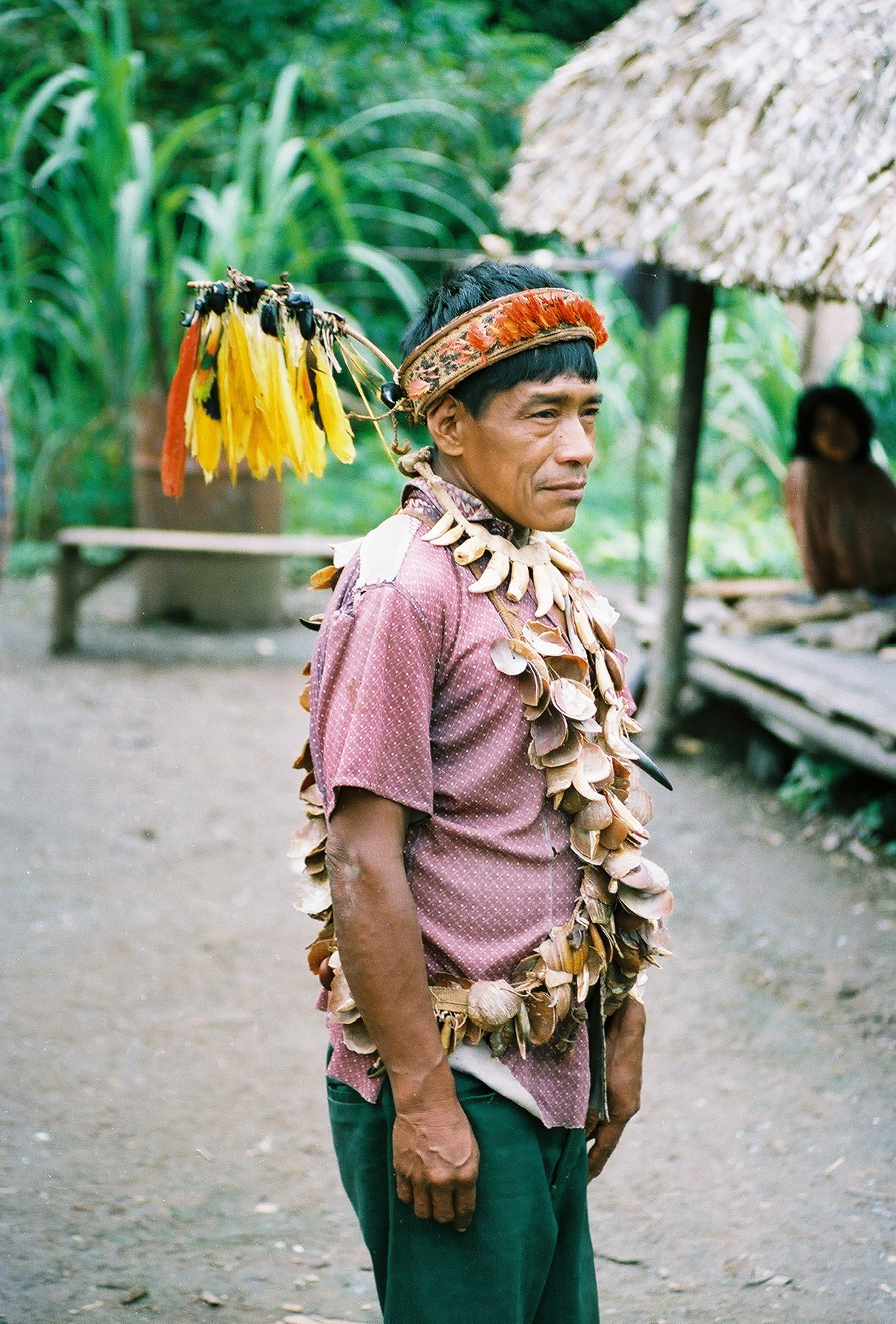
Urarina shaman, 1988

In the Peruvian Amazon basin and north coastal regions of the country, the healers are known as curanderos. Ayahuasqueros are Peruvians who specialize in the use of ayahuasca. Ayahuasqueros have become popular among Western spiritual seekers, who claim that the ayauasqueros and their ayahuasca brews have cured them of everything from depression to addiction to cancer.

In addition to curanderos use of ayahuasca and their ritualized ingestion of mescaline-bearing San Pedro cactuses (Echinopsis pachanoi) for the divination and diagnosis of sorcery, north-coastal shamans are famous throughout the region for their intricately complex and symbolically dense healing altars called mesas (tables). Sharon (1993) has argued that the mesas symbolize the dualistic ideology underpinning the practice and experience of north-coastal shamanism. For Sharon, the mesas are the, "physical embodiment of the supernatural opposition between benevolent and malevolent energies" (Dean 1998: 61).

In several tribes living in the Amazon rainforest, the spiritual leaders also act as managers of scarce ecological resources The rich symbolism in Tukano culture has been documented in field works even in the last decades of the 20th century.

The yaskomo of the Waiwai is believed to be able to perform a soul flight. The soul flight can serve several functions:

- healing
- flying to the sky to consult cosmological beings (the moon or the brother of the moon) to get a name for a newborn baby
- flying to the cave of peccaries' mountains to ask the father of peccaries for abundance of game
- flying deep down in a river, to achieve the help of other beings.

Thus, a yaskomo is believed to be able to reach sky, earth, and water.

==== Mapuche ====
Among the Mapuche people of Chile, a machi is usually a woman who serves the community by performing ceremonies to cure diseases, ward off evil, influence the weather and harvest, and by practicing other forms of healing such as herbalism.

==== Aymara ====
For the Aymara people of South America the Yatiri is a healer who heals the body and the soul, they serve the community and do the rituals for Pachamama.

Part of the healing power attributed to shamanic practices depends on the use of plant alkaloids taken during the therapeutic sessions.

==== Fuegians ====
Although Fuegians (the indigenous peoples of Tierra del Fuego) were all hunter-gatherers, they did not share a common culture. The material culture was not homogenous, either: the big island and the archipelago made two different adaptations possible. Some of the cultures were coast-dwelling, others were land-oriented.

Both Selkʼnam and Yámana had persons filling in shaman-like roles. The Selkʼnams believed their /xon/s to have supernatural capabilities, e.g. to control weather. The figure of /xon/ appeared in myths, too. The Yámana /jekamuʃ/ corresponds to the Selknam /xon/.

== Oceania ==
On the island of Papua New Guinea, indigenous tribes believe that illness and calamity are caused by dark spirits, or masalai, which cling to a person's body and poison them. Shamans are summoned in order to purge the unwholesome spirits from a person. Shamans also perform rainmaking ceremonies and can allegedly improve a hunter's ability to catch animals.

In Australia various aboriginal groups refer to their shamans as "clever men" and "clever women" also as kadji. These aboriginal shamans use maban or mabain, the material that is believed to give them their purported magical powers. Besides healing, contact with spiritual beings, involvement in initiation and other secret ceremonies, they are also enforcers of tribal laws, keepers of special knowledge and may "hex" to death one who breaks a social taboo by singing a song only known to the "clever men".

== Africa ==
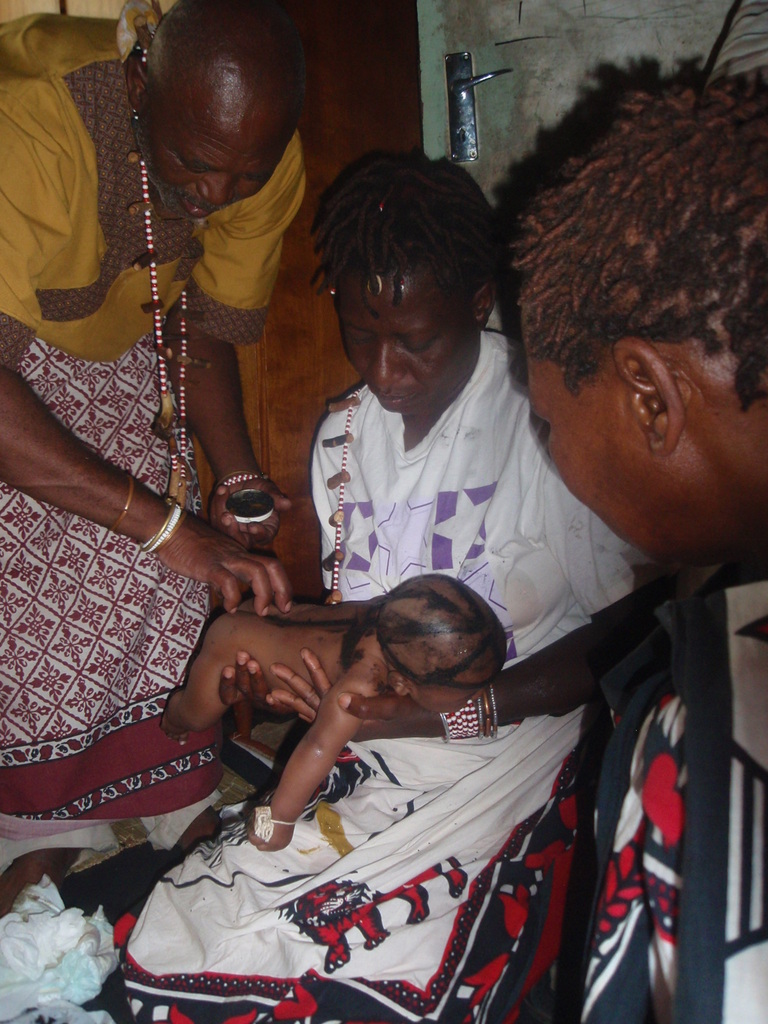
Sangoma/Inyanga performing a traditional baptism on a baby in order to protect the spirit of the baby, Johannesburg, South Africa

In Mali, Dogon sorcerers (both male and female) communicate with a spirit named Amma, who advises them on healing and divination practices.

The classical meaning of shaman as a person who, after recovering from a mental illness (or insanity) takes up the professional calling of socially recognized religious practitioner, is exemplified among the Sisala (of northern Gold Coast): "the fairies "seized" him and made him insane for several months. Eventually, though, he learned to control their power, which he now uses to divine."

The term sangoma, as employed in Zulu and congeneric languages, is effectively equivalent to shaman. Sangomas are highly revered and respected in their society, where illness is thought to be caused by witchcraft, pollution (contact with impure objects or occurrences), bad spirits, or the ancestors themselves, either malevolently, or through neglect if they are not respected, or to show an individual her calling to become a sangoma (thwasa). For harmony between the living and the dead, vital for a trouble-free life, the ancestors must be shown respect through ritual and animal sacrifice.

The term inyanga also employed by the Nguni cultures is equivalent to 'herbalist' as used by the Zulu people and a variation used by the Karanga, among whom remedies (locally known as muti) for ailments are discovered by the inyanga being informed in a dream, of the herb able to effect the cure and also of where that herb is to be found. The majority of the herbal knowledge base is passed down from one inyanga to the next, often within a particular family circle in any one village.

Shamanism is known among the Nuba of Kordofan in Sudan.

== Neoshamanism ==
There is an endeavor in some contemporary occult and esoteric circles to reinvent shamanism in a modern form, often drawing from core shamanism — a set of beliefs and practices synthesized by Michael Harner — centered on the use of ritual drumming and dance and Harner's interpretations of various indigenous religions. Harner has faced criticism for taking pieces of diverse religions out of their cultural contexts in an attempt to create "universal" shamanistic practices. Some neoshamans focus on the ritual use of entheogens, and also embrace the philosophies of chaos magic while others (such as Jan Fries) have created their own forms of shamanism.

Eurasian-based neoshamanic traditions are focused upon the researched or imagined traditions of ancient Eurasia, where many mystical practices and belief systems were suppressed by the Christian church. Some of these practitioners express a desire to practice a system that is based upon their own ancestral traditions. Some anthropologists and practitioners have discussed the impact of such neoshamanism as "giving extra pay" (Harvey, 1997 and elsewhere) to indigenous American traditions, particularly as many pagan or heathen shamanic practitioners do not call themselves shamans, but instead use specific names derived from the Eurasian traditions—they work within such as völva or seidkona (seid-woman) of the sagas (see Blain 2002, Wallis 2003).

Many spiritual seekers travel to Peru to work with ayahuasqueros, shamans who engage in the ritual use of ayahuasca. When taking ayahuasca, participants frequently report meeting spirits, and receiving divine revelations. Shamanistic techniques have also been used in New Age therapies which use enactment and association with other realities as an intervention.

== Sources ==
- Diószegi, Vilmos (1998) [1958]. A sámánhit emlékei a magyar népi műveltségben (in Hungarian) (first reprint ed.). Budapest: Akadémiai Kiadó. ISBN 978-963-05-7542-3.
- Hajdú, Péter (1975). "A rokonság nyelvi háttere". In Hajdú, Péter (ed.). Uráli népek. Nyelvrokonaink kultúrája és hagyományai (in Hungarian). Budapest: Corvina Kiadó. ISBN 978-963-13-0900-3.
- Hoppál, Mihály (1994). Sámánok, lelkek és jelképek (in Hungarian). Budapest: Helikon Kiadó. ISBN 978-963-208-298-1.
- Hoppál, Mihály (1998). "A honfoglalók hitvilága és a magyar samanizmus". Folklór és közösség (in Hungarian). Budapest: Széphalom Könyvműhely. pp. 40–45. ISBN 978-963-9028-14-2.
- Hoppál, Mihály (2005). Sámánok Eurázsiában (in Hungarian). Budapest: Akadémiai Kiadó. ISBN 978-963-05-8295-7.
- Hugh-Jones, Christine (1980). From the Milk River : spatial and temporal processes in northwest Amazonia. Cambridge New York: Cambridge University Press. ISBN 978-0-521-22544-1. OCLC 4492309.
- Kleivan, Inge; B. Sonne (1985). Eskimos: Greenland and Canada. Iconography of religions, section VIII, "Arctic Peoples", fascicle 2. Leiden, The Netherlands: Institute of Religious Iconography • State University Groningen. E.J. Brill. ISBN 978-90-04-07160-5.
- Menovščikov, G.A. (= Г. А. Меновщиков) (1968). "Popular Conceptions, Religious Beliefs and Rites of the Asiatic Eskimoes". In Diószegi, Vilmos (ed.). Popular beliefs and folklore tradition in Siberia. Budapest: Akadémiai Kiadó.
- Riordan, Ann (1994). Boundaries and passages : rule and ritual in Yup'ik Eskimo oral tradition. Norman: University of Oklahoma Press. ISBN 978-0-8061-2646-3. OCLC 44957442.
