= Lên đồng =

Vietnamese shamanic ritual

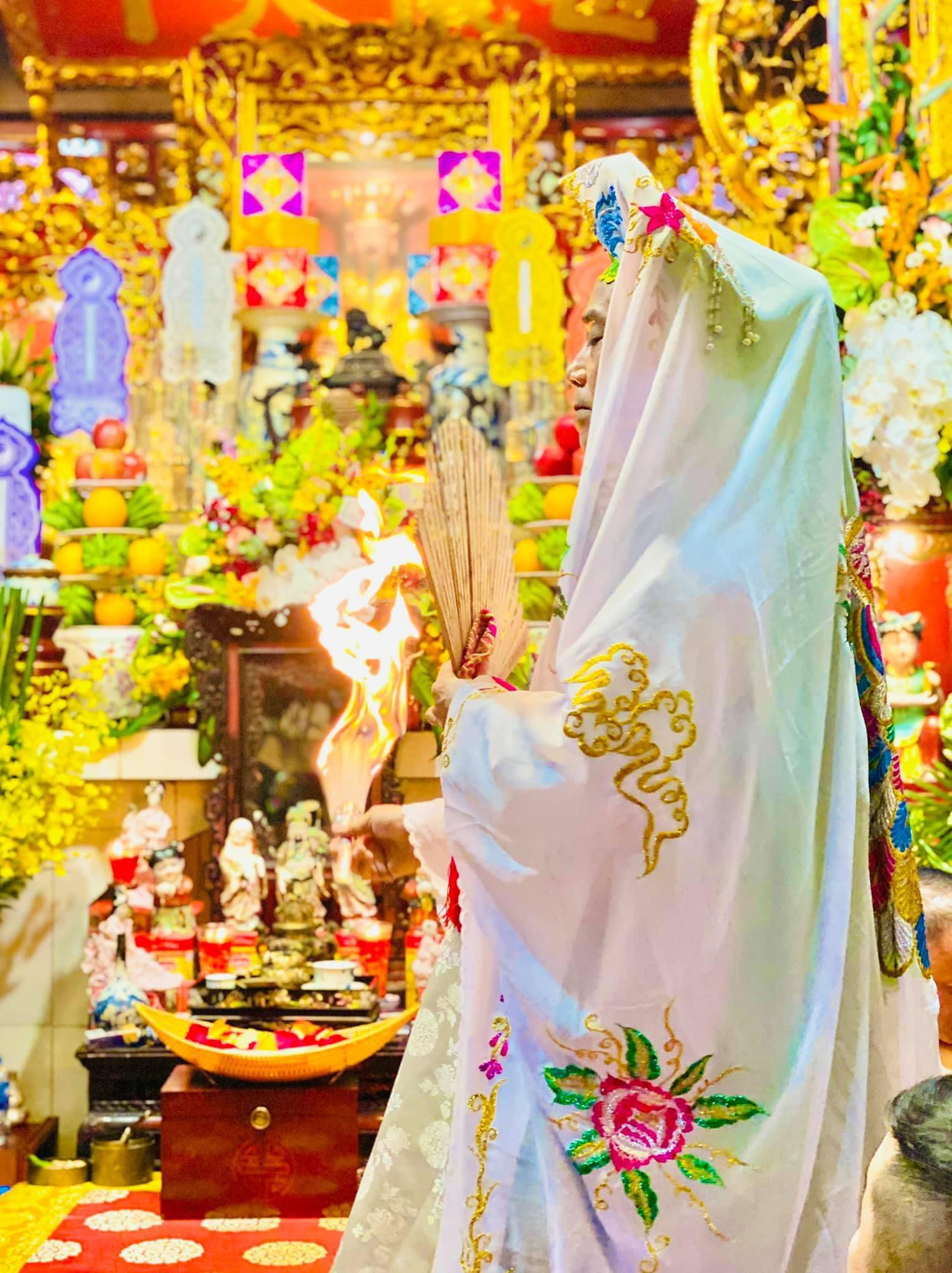
The lên đồng ritual in process.

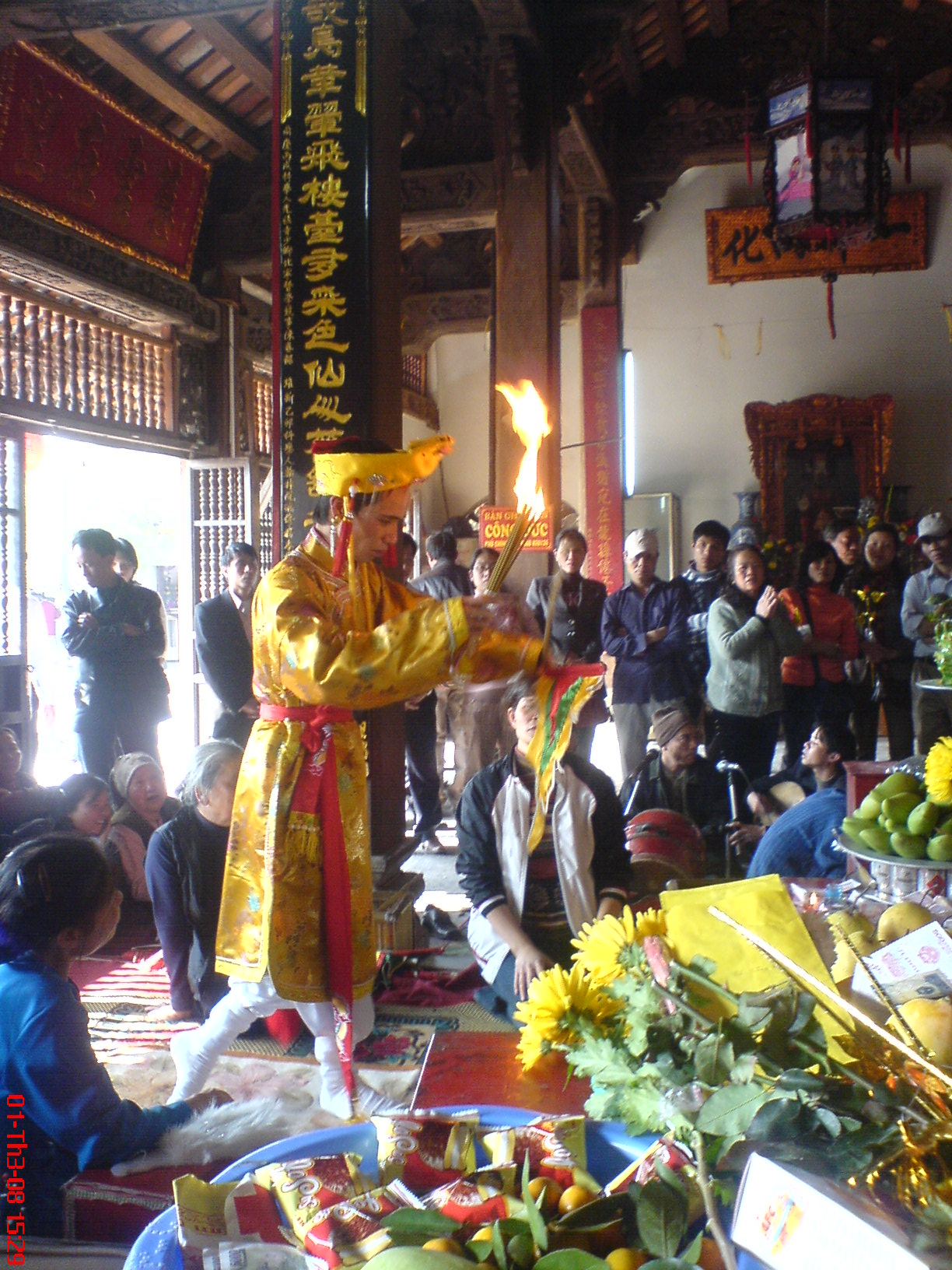
Múa mồi (fire dance) in lên đồng ritual.

Lên đồng (Vietnamese: [len ɗə̂wŋm], meaning votive dance, "to mount the medium", or "going into trance") is a ritual practiced in Vietnamese folk religion, in which followers become spirit mediums for various kinds of spirits.

There is a common confusion between "lên đồng" and "hầu bóng" (which is the most prominent ritual of Đạo Mẫu). During a ceremony of "Hầu Bóng" (lit. Serving the Holy Reflections), a priest or priestess would mimic the deities by dressing and acting like them. The priest is in full control of their body. A successful ceremony is one in which the priest feels the deities' essences but it does not mean the deities' spirits enter the priest's mortal body. As a religious leader authorized to perform the sacred rituals of a religion, especially as a mediatory agent between humans and one or more deities, the "thanh đồng" in Đạo Mẫu is more of the equivalent of a priest rather than a medium or a shaman.

== Overview ==
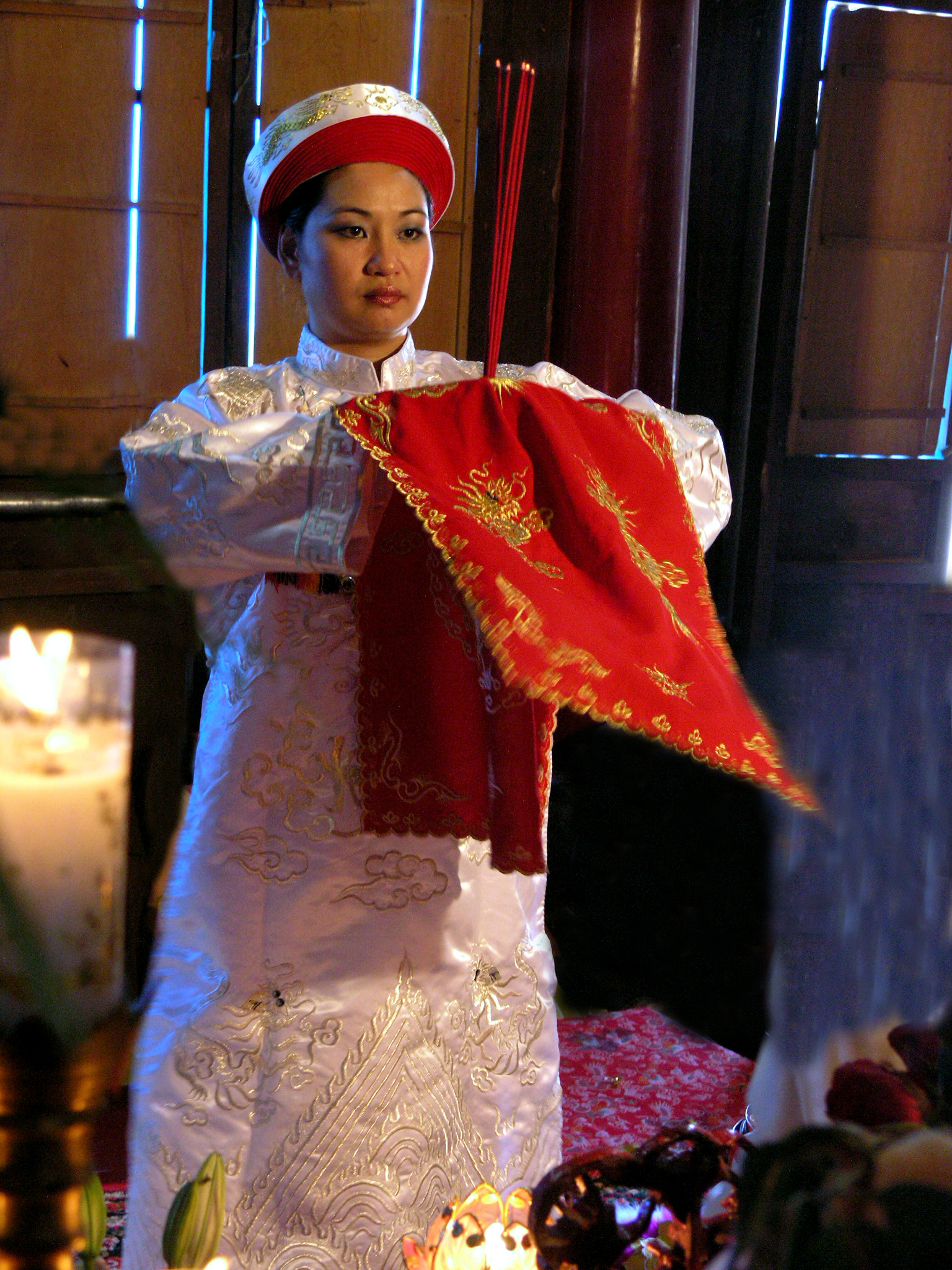
A đồng cốt doing the lên đồng ritual in the temple

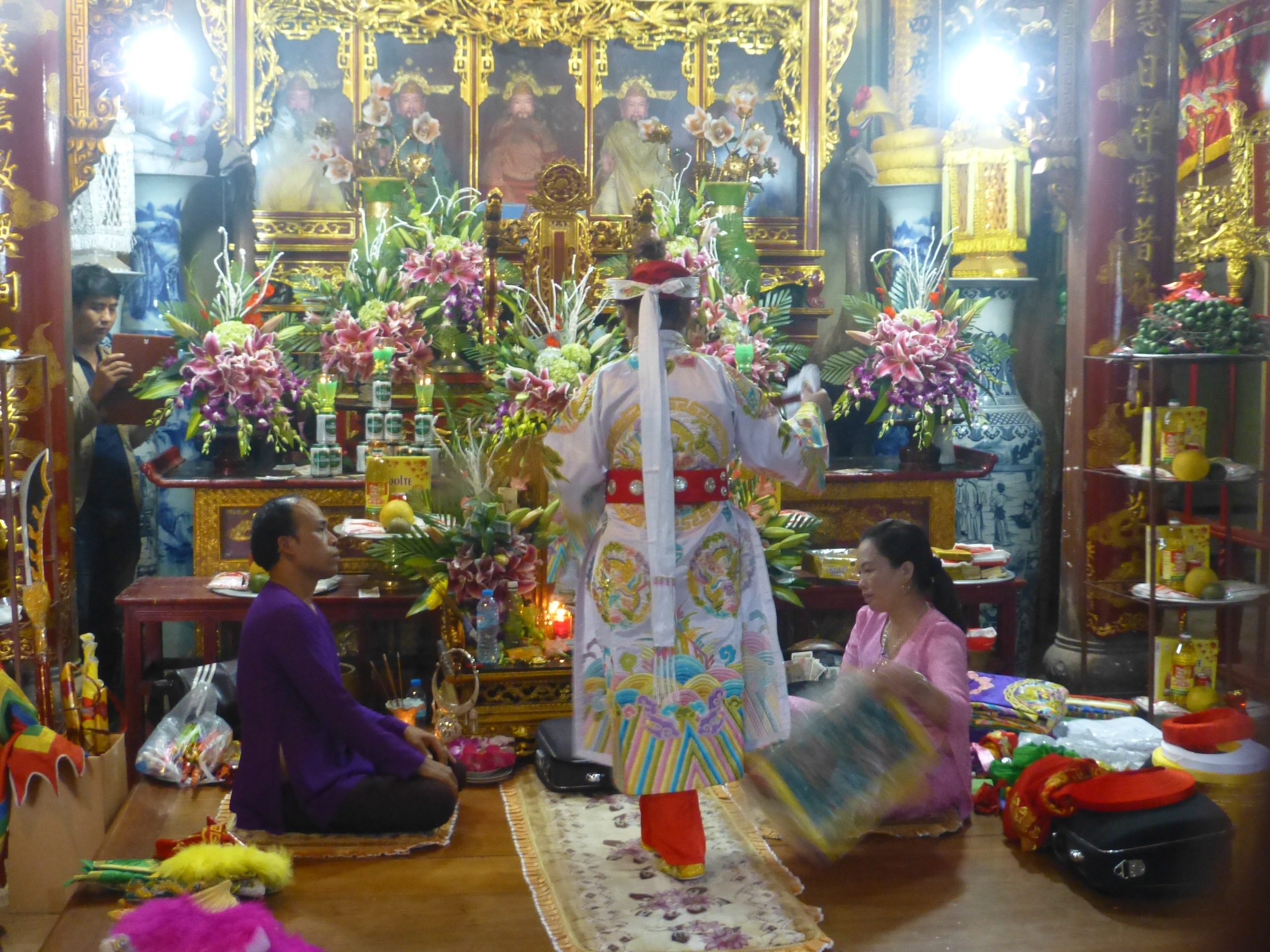
A thanh đồng is incarnating into god Quan hoàng Bơ

Lên đồng is commonly associated with Đạo Mẫu, Thánh Trần worship and Nội Đạo Tràng. The date of lên đồng rituals are typically planned to coincide with a festival, anniversary, or the inauguration of a Mother house, although rituals may also be performed at more informal occasions. Rituals are generally held in temples, shrines or similarly sacred locations. Joss paper—which may range from flowers, cakes and sweets to alcohol, cigarettes and jewelry—and, on certain occasions, even Coca-Cola cans (Note: Coca-Cola cans are used particularly for their colour, as noted in Kendall (2003): "The medium pays special attention to the color of the votive offerings, so that each spirit receives offerings that are the same color as the realm with which she or he is associated." (p.261) Red is a colour associated with the "celestial sky palace", therefore the red cans are "appropriate offerings for spirits from the Heavenly Realm". (p. 260–261) Ngo Duc Thinh (2003). "Chapter 13: Len Dong: Spirits' Journeys". In Nguyen Van Huy; Laurel Kendall (eds.). Vietnam: journeys of body, mind, and spirit. University of California Press. ISBN 0-520-23871-0.)—must be purchased. Mediums generally also purchase a number of different costumes to be worn during the ritual. Before the main ritual takes place, mediums undergo several days of purifying rituals, involving abstention from sexual intercourse and eating meat.

The main ritual, which may last from two to seven hours, begins with petitions to Buddha and to the deities for permission to carry out the ritual, after which the medium seats him or herself (both men and women may act as mediums) in the middle of four assistants, whose job it is to facilitate the medium's incarnation of different deities and spirits. Specially trained musicians and singers will perform invocation songs to induce a trance in the medium, at which point he or she will be ready to incarnate different spirits.

Assistants will help the medium don different costumes to match the particular gods they are incarnating; for example, if a practitioner is acting as a medium for a god who takes the form of a general, he or she may wear a general's robes, and perform a dance incorporating swords or other weapons. A medium may incarnate several gods during one session, changing his or her costume and adapting his or her movements to each. Musicians—singers and instrumentalists—accompany the practitioner, and shift from one musical style to the next depending on which god is being incarnated. When the dance is finished, the audience is allowed to approach the still-possessed medium to make offerings, petition the deity being incarnated in exchange for favours, or to have their fortune told. The medium offers sacred gifts in return, often in the form of joss sticks.

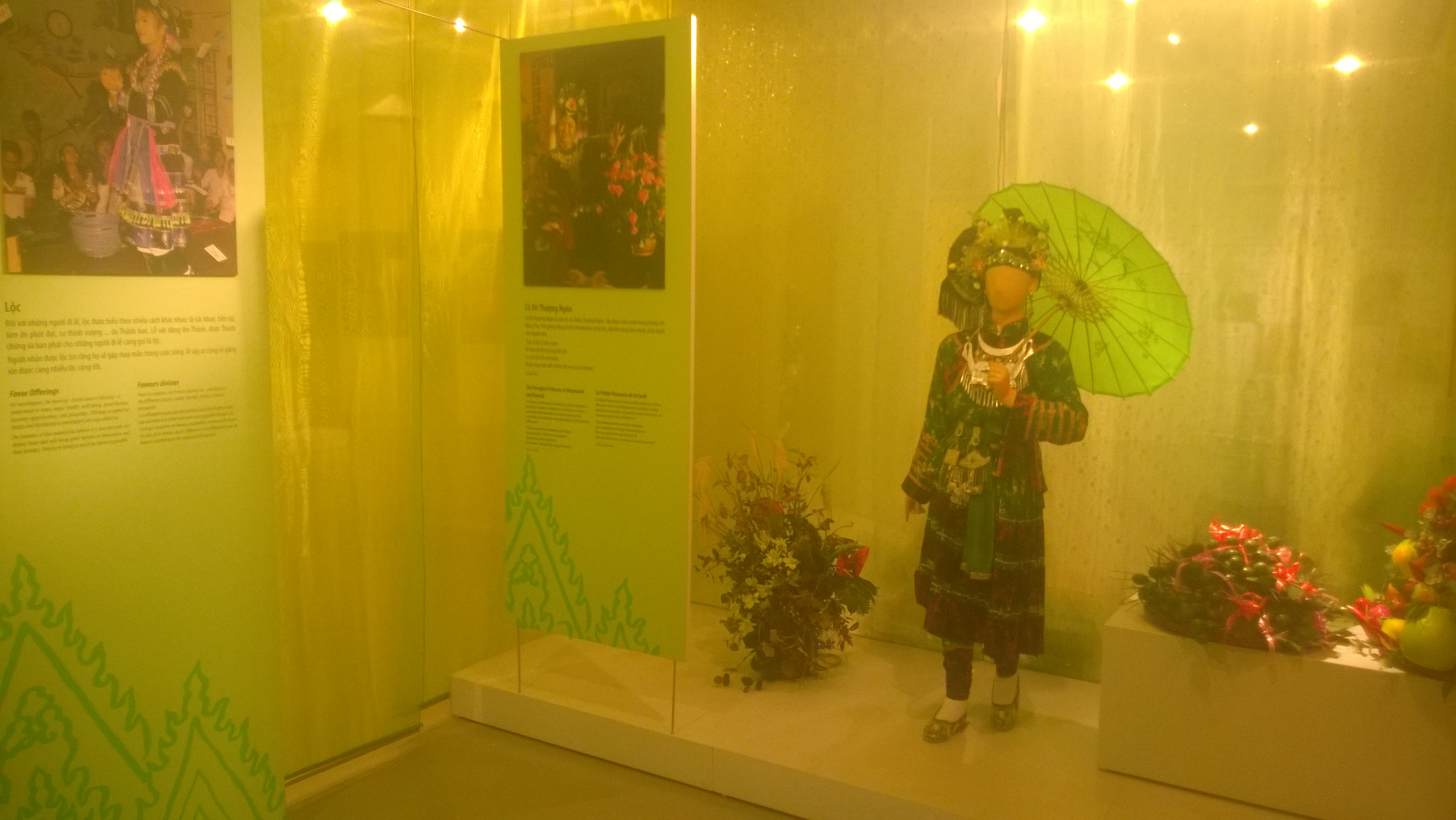
The costume of the goddess Cô bé Thượng ngàn in lên đồng ritual

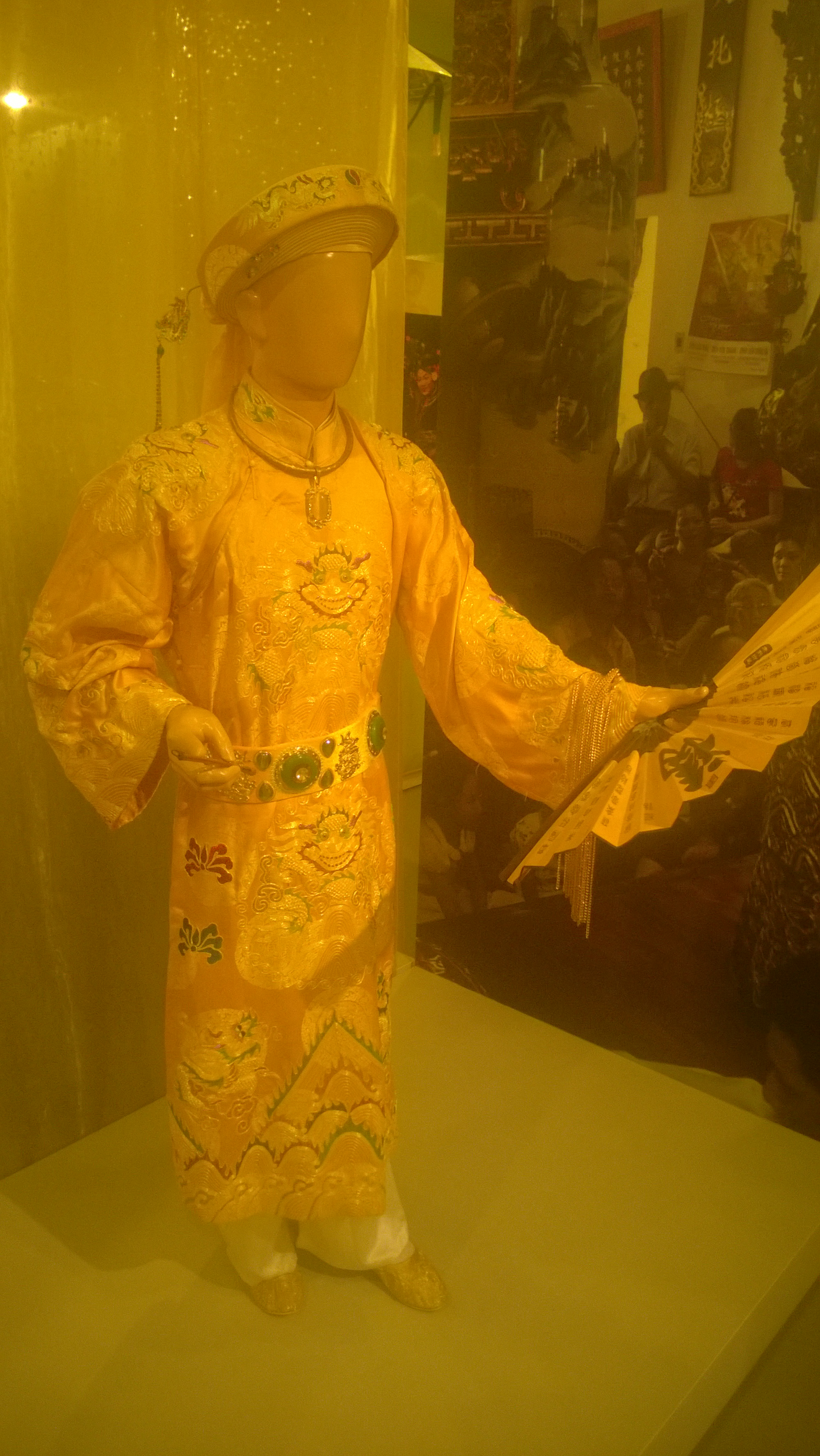
The costume of the god Quan hoàng Mười in lên đồng ritual

== History ==
=== Contemporary practice ===
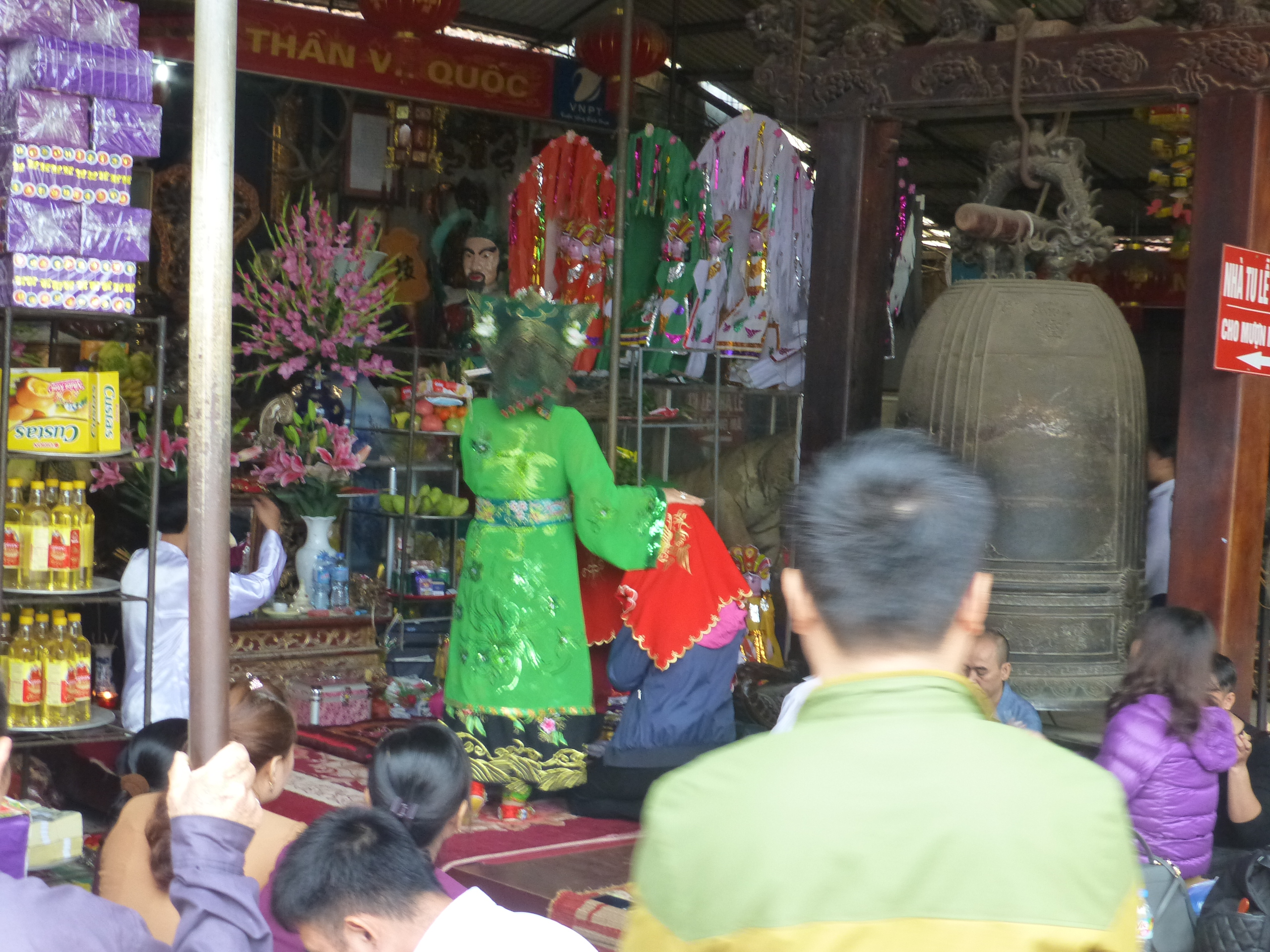
Lên đồng at Bảo Hà Temple

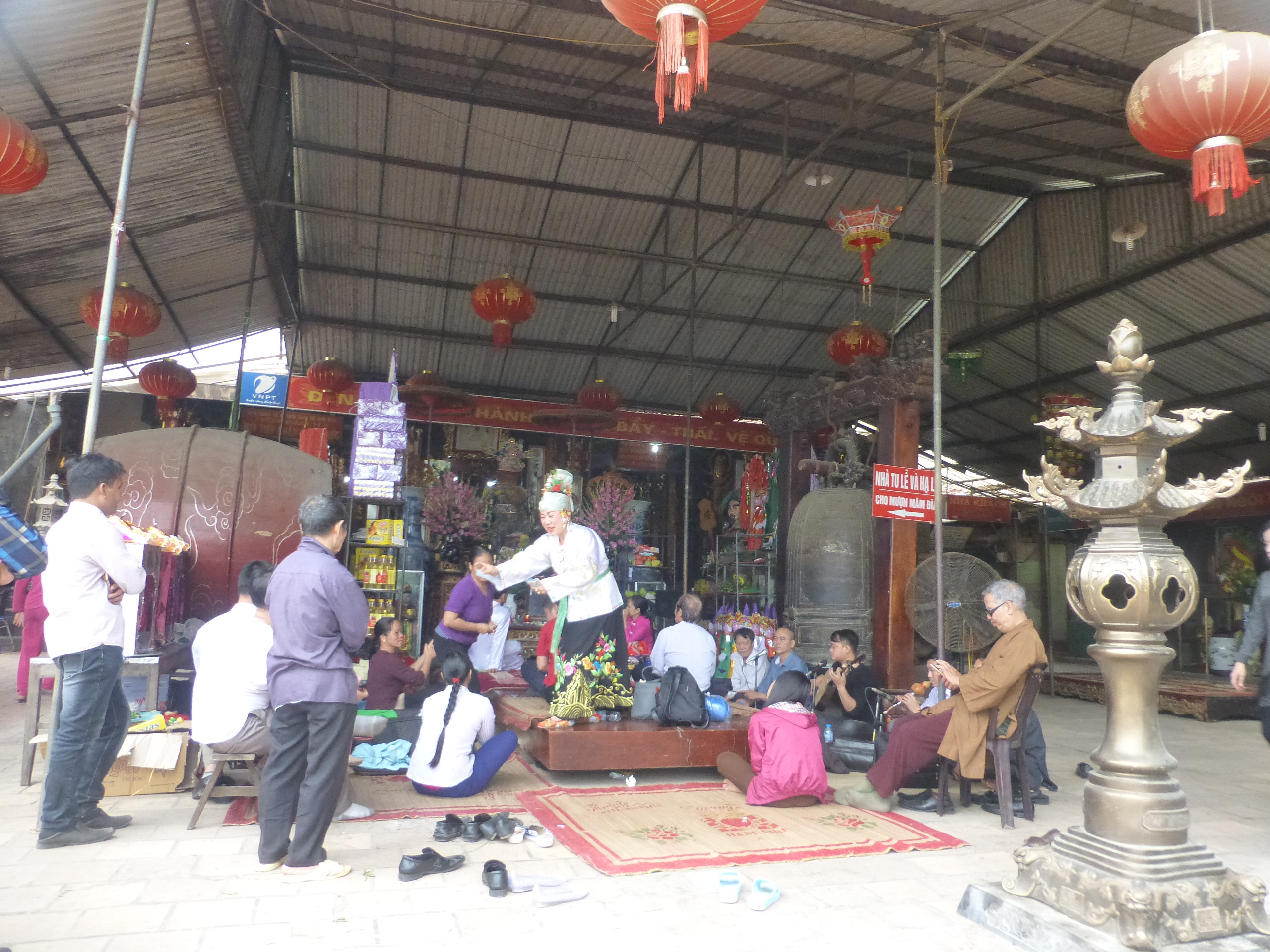
Tán lộc - part of Lên đồng ritual

During early Communist rule, the practice of lên đồng (and Đạo Mẫu in general) were seen as forms of superstition and proscribed, although practitioners continued to perform rituals in secret. In 1987, after a period of prohibition, the Vietnamese government relaxed restrictions on the practice of lên đồng, and it gradually saw a recurrence in popularity; in 2001, it was the subject of an international conference, and a foreign delegation was allowed to attend a festival at Phủ Giày in Nam Định Province. While practitioners are generally allowed to practice in private, government opposition to the practice still exists; in 2010, for instance, a government circular was enacted to curb certain forms of lên đồng practice, specifically formal lên đồng festivals. (Note: Circular No. 04/2009/TT-BVHTTDL, issued on December 16, 2009, sets forth regulations on "cultural activities" that expand on Decree No. 103/2009/ND-CP on the same subject. Clause 4, Article 3, Chapter II of the Circular states: "Cultural activities and services with superstitious contents [which are prohibited in the Decree] are those with contents of unnaturally bewitching others to adversely affect their consciousness, including making offerings to expel evil spirits, treating diseases through incantation, going into trances to make orders, telling fortune, resorting to sortilege, shaking divinatory wands, spreading prophesies, reciting incantation, exorcizing amulets to harm others for self-interest, burning votive papers in public places and other forms of superstition." The Circular and Decree have been interpreted as forbidding the practice of len dong in formal public festivals. ("Culture Vulture". Vietnam News Service. 2010-09-30.))

Lên đồng is performed throughout Vietnam, and also in places with significant populations of Overseas Vietnamese, such as the United States (notably in Silicon Valley, south of San Francisco, California), Italy, France and Australia. Lên đồng can also be seen as the Vietnamese version of East Asian spirit mediumship practiced in places such as Taiwan, Singapore and Hong Kong.

== Etymology ==
The word 'đồng' or 'toŋ' is believed to be an Austroasiatic lexicon. It means shaman in Mon. In the Munda languages, it means 'to dance' in Sora and 'a kind of dance, drumming and singing connected with wedding ceremony' in Santali.

== See also ==
- Adorcism
- Chầu văn — the form of music used in lên đồng rituals
- Đạo Mẫu
- Nat pwe — similar ritual in Burmese folk religion
- Spirit possession
- Mediumship
- Vietnamese folk religion
- Religion in Vietnam

== Notes and references ==
Notes
