= Chầu văn =

Vietnamese music genre

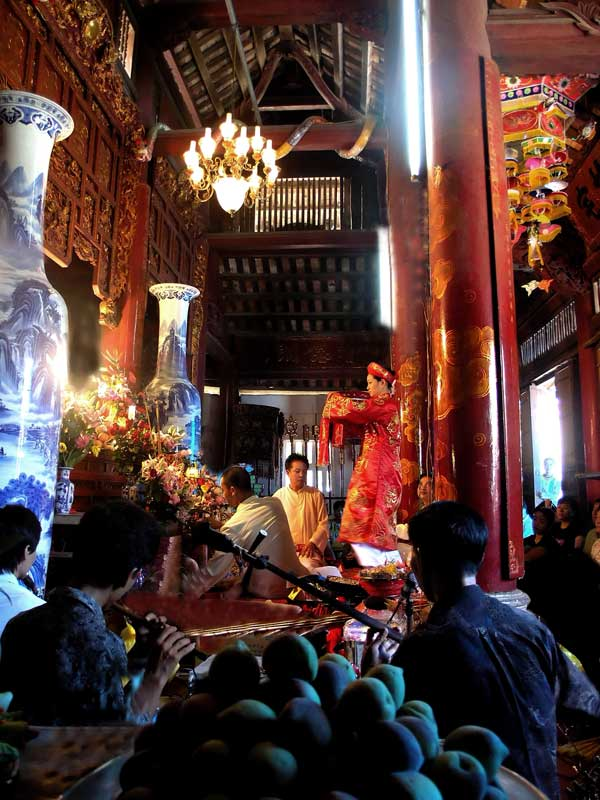
Hát chầu văn in the lên đồng ritual

Hát chầu văn (Vietnamese: [háːt cə̂w van], chữ Nôm: 喝朝文), or in secular form hát văn (喝文), is a traditional folk art of northern Vietnam which combines trance singing and dancing. Its music and poetry are combined with a variety of instruments, rhythms, pauses, and tempos. Hát chầu văn originated in the 16th century and spread quickly. The main musical instrument used in hat van performance is the đàn nguyệt or moon-shaped lute. The genre is famous for its use in rituals for deity mediumship. Chầu văn serves two purposes: to help hypnotize the medium for reception of the deities and to accompany the medium's actions with appropriate music.

The singing and dance in non-religious form is hát văn ("sung literature") without the word chầu ("to have an audience with someone of higher power", "to perform a service and pay homage to a deity").

== See also ==
- Lên đồng
