= Thánh Trần worship =

Shaman worship of Thánh Trần in Vietnam

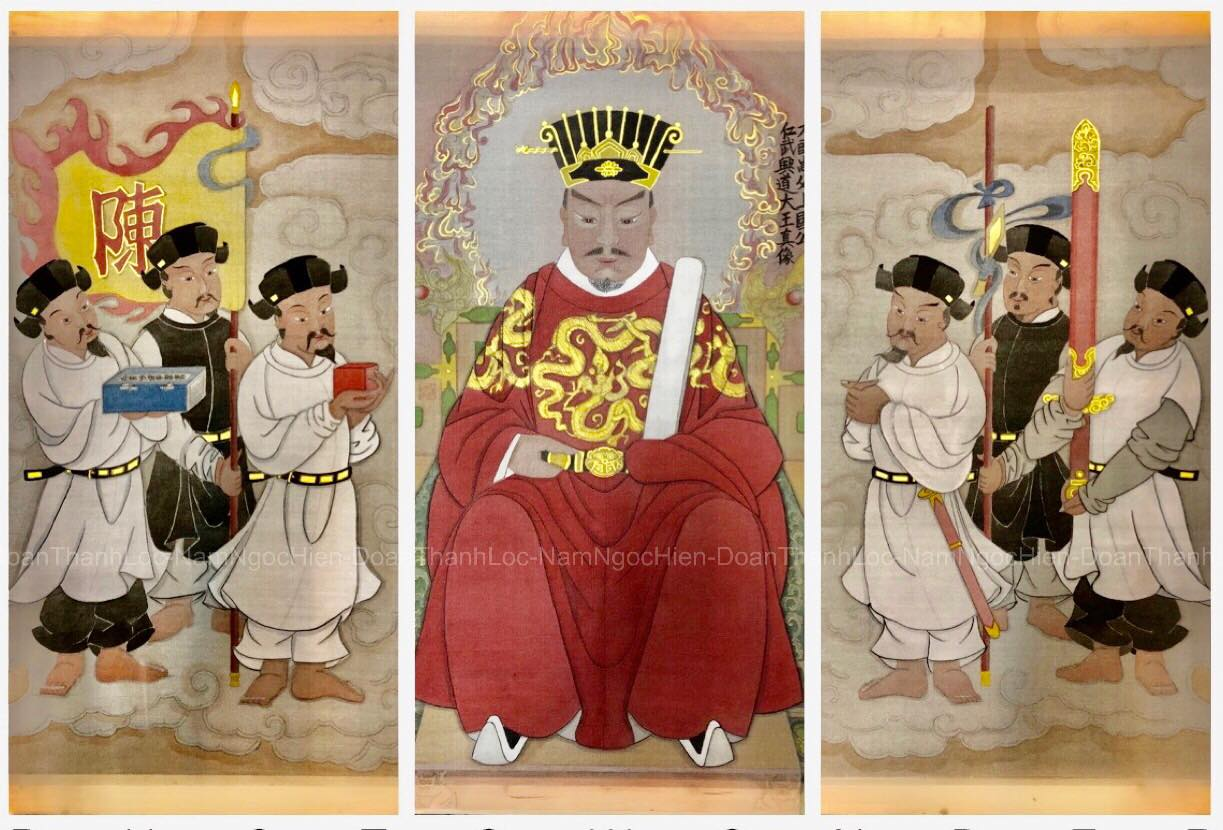
The three watercolor paintings depict Thánh Trần (Đức Thánh Hưng Đạo) and his six generals

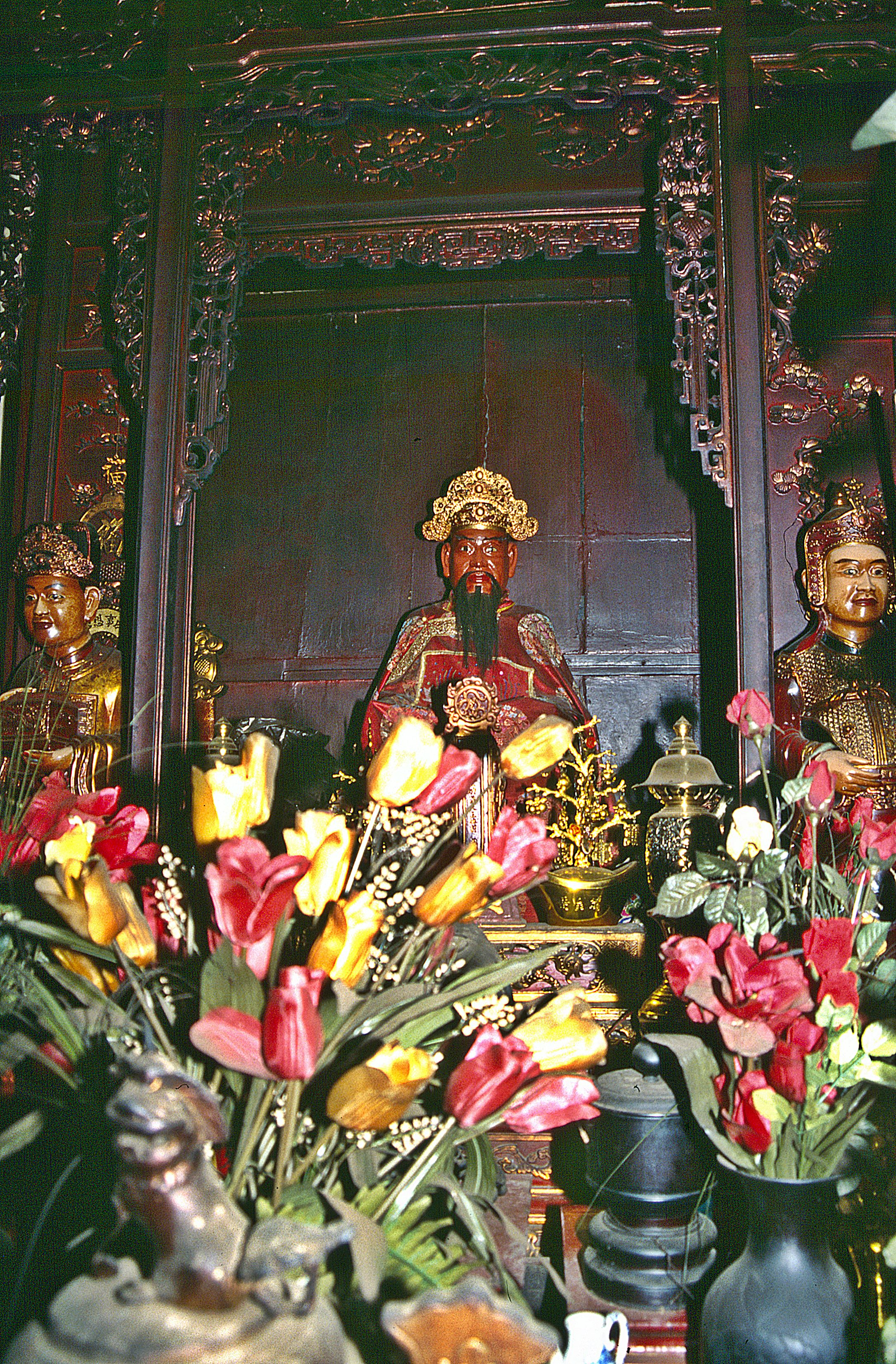
The statue of Đức Thánh Trần in the Temple of the Jade Mountain

The Thánh Trần worship (Vietnamese: tín ngưỡng thờ Đức Thánh Trần) is one of three branches of shamanism of Vietnamese folk religion (the other two are Đạo Mẫu and Nội Đạo Tràng). This shamanic belief is associated with the spirit of historical general Trần Hưng Đạo, who repulsed several invasions by the Mongol Empire and the Yuan dynasty.

According to this religious tradition, he was believed to be Thanh Tiên Đồng Tử, who descended to the mortal world by order of the Jade Emperor to protect the country and bring peace to its people. After returning to Heaven, he has been bestowed the title Cửu Thiên Vũ Đế (lit. Martial Emperor of Nine Heavens) by the Jade Emperor and granted the power to expel evil spirits and subdue demons throughout all realms.

The worship is sometimes referred to as Trần Triều (lit. Trần dynasty).

Mediumship with the spirit of Thánh Trần is part of votive dance lên đồng mediumship and is particularly associated with Đạo Mẫu (道母), mother goddess worship. Mediums are mainly female, possession of a male by the spirit is viewed as unusual.

== Genealogy in religious tradition ==
Besides the Martial Emperor, the principal deity who occupies the central position in the tradition’s system of worship, the Saint Trần worship also venerates a number of other figures associated with him, including members of his family and military commanders who serve under his command.

- Parents:
  - Royal Father: Grand Prince Khâm Minh (欽明大王), the Saint's father.
  - Royal Mother: National Matriarch Thiện Đạo (善道國母), the Saint's mother.
- Spouse:
  - Royal Consort: National Matriarch Nguyên Từ (元慈國母), the Saint's wife.
- Offspring: the Four Royal Sons
  - The First Royal Son: Prince Hưng Vũ (興武王), name Trần Quốc Nghiễn.
  - The Second Royal Son: Prince Hưng Hiếu (興孝王).
  - The Third Royal Son: Prince Hưng Nhượng (興讓王), name Trần Quốc Tảng.
  - The Fourth Royal Son: Prince Hưng Trí (興智王), name Trần Quốc Hiện.
- Offspring: the Two Royal Daughters
  - The First Royal Daughter: Princess Quyên Thanh (娟清公主), historically known as Empress Consort Khâm Từ Bảo Thánh.
  - The Second Royal Daughter: Princess Anh Nguyên (英元公主). She was married to Palace's Chief General Phạm, one of the Martial Emperor's Six Generals.
- Subordinate generals: the Six Generals (Lục Bộ Tướng Quân)
  - Palace’s Chief General Phạm (范殿帥上將軍)
  - General Yết Kiêu (歇驕左將軍)
  - General Dã Tượng (野象右將軍)
  - General Hùng Thắng (雄勝將軍)
  - General Huyền Quang (玄光將軍)
  - General Nghĩa Xuyên (義川將軍)
