= Tutelary deity =

Guardian/patron deity or spirit

A tutelary (/ˈtjuːtəlɛri/; also tutelar) is a deity or a spirit who is a guardian, patron, or protector of a particular place, geographic feature, person, lineage, nation, culture, or occupation. The etymology of tutelary expresses the concept of safety and thus of guardianship.

In late Greek and Roman religion, one type of tutelary deity, the genius, functions as the personal deity or daimon of an individual from birth to death. Another form of personal tutelary spirit is the familiar spirit of European folklore.

== Ancient Greece ==
Socrates spoke of hearing the voice of his personal spirit or daimonion:

You have often heard me speak of an oracle or sign which comes to me … . This sign I have had ever since I was a child. The sign is a voice which comes to me and always forbids me to do something which I am going to do, but never commands me to do anything, and this is what stands in the way of my being a politician.

The Greeks also thought deities guarded specific places: for instance, Athena was the patron goddess of the city of Athens.

== Ancient Rome ==
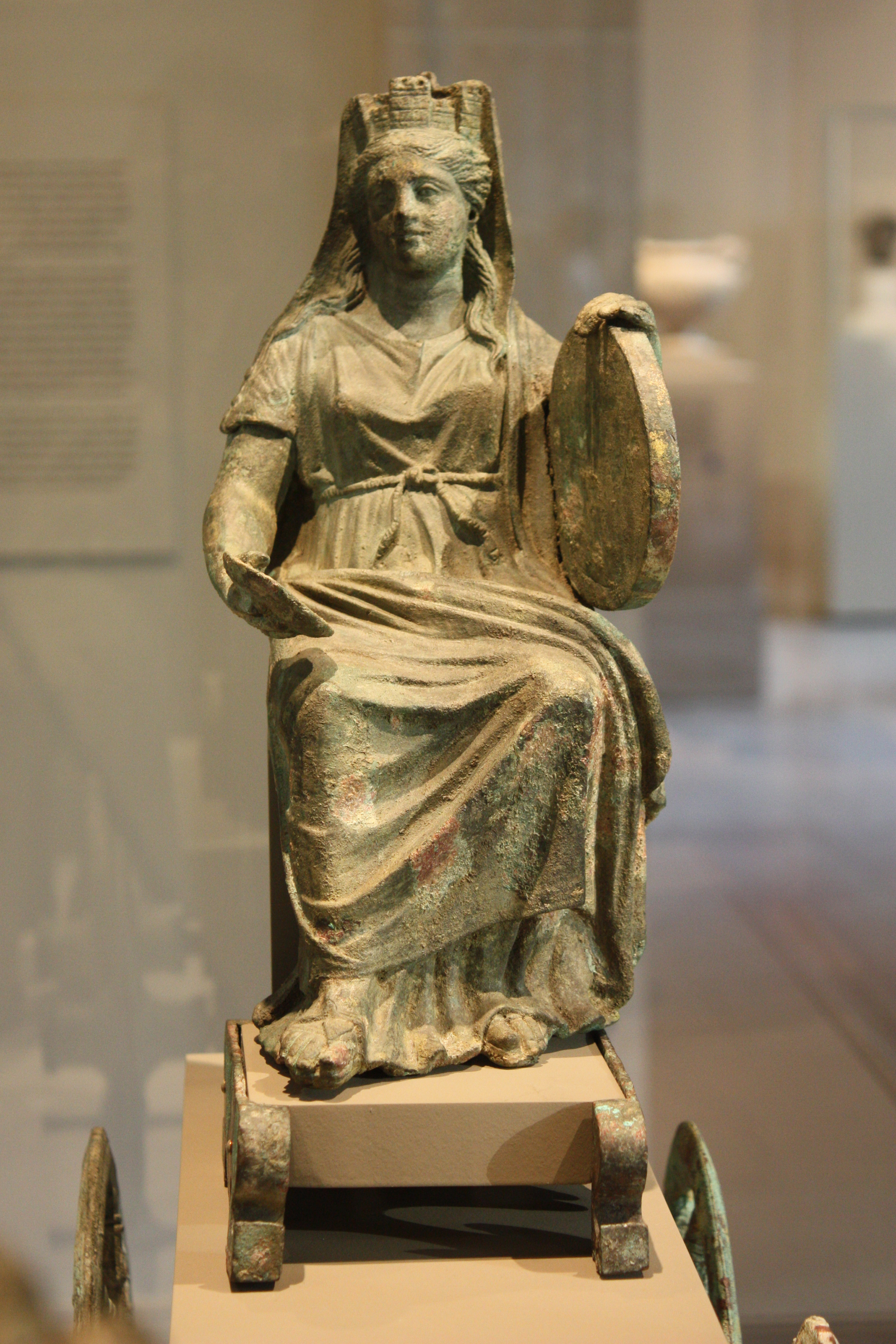
The mural crown of Cybele represents the walls of the city she protects

Tutelary deities who guard and preserve a place or a person are fundamental to ancient Roman religion. The tutelary deity of a man was his Genius, that of a woman her Juno. In the Imperial era, the Genius of the Emperor was a focus of Imperial cult. An emperor might also adopt a major deity as his personal patron or tutelary, as Augustus did Apollo. Precedents for claiming the personal protection of a deity were established in the Republican era, when for instance the Roman dictator Sulla advertised the goddess Victory as his tutelary by holding public games (ludi) in her honor.

Each town or city had one or more tutelary deities, whose protection was considered particularly vital in time of war and siege. Rome itself was protected by a goddess whose name was to be kept ritually secret on pain of death (for a supposed case, see Quintus Valerius Soranus). The Capitoline Triad of Juno, Jupiter, and Minerva were also tutelaries of Rome.

The Italic towns had their own tutelary deities. Juno often had this function, as at the Latin town of Lanuvium and the Etruscan city of Veii, and was often housed in an especially grand temple on the arx (citadel) or other prominent or central location. The tutelary deity of Praeneste was Fortuna, whose oracle was renowned.

The Roman ritual of evocatio was premised on the belief that a town could be made vulnerable to military defeat if the power of its tutelary deity were diverted outside the city, perhaps by the offer of superior cult at Rome. The depiction of some goddesses such as the Magna Mater (Great Mother, or Cybele) as "tower-crowned" represents their capacity to preserve the city.

A town in the provinces might adopt a deity from within the Roman religious sphere to serve as its guardian, or syncretize its own tutelary with such; for instance, a community within the civitas of the Remi in Gaul adopted Apollo as its tutelary, and at the capital of the Remi (present-day Rheims), the tutelary was Mars Camulus.

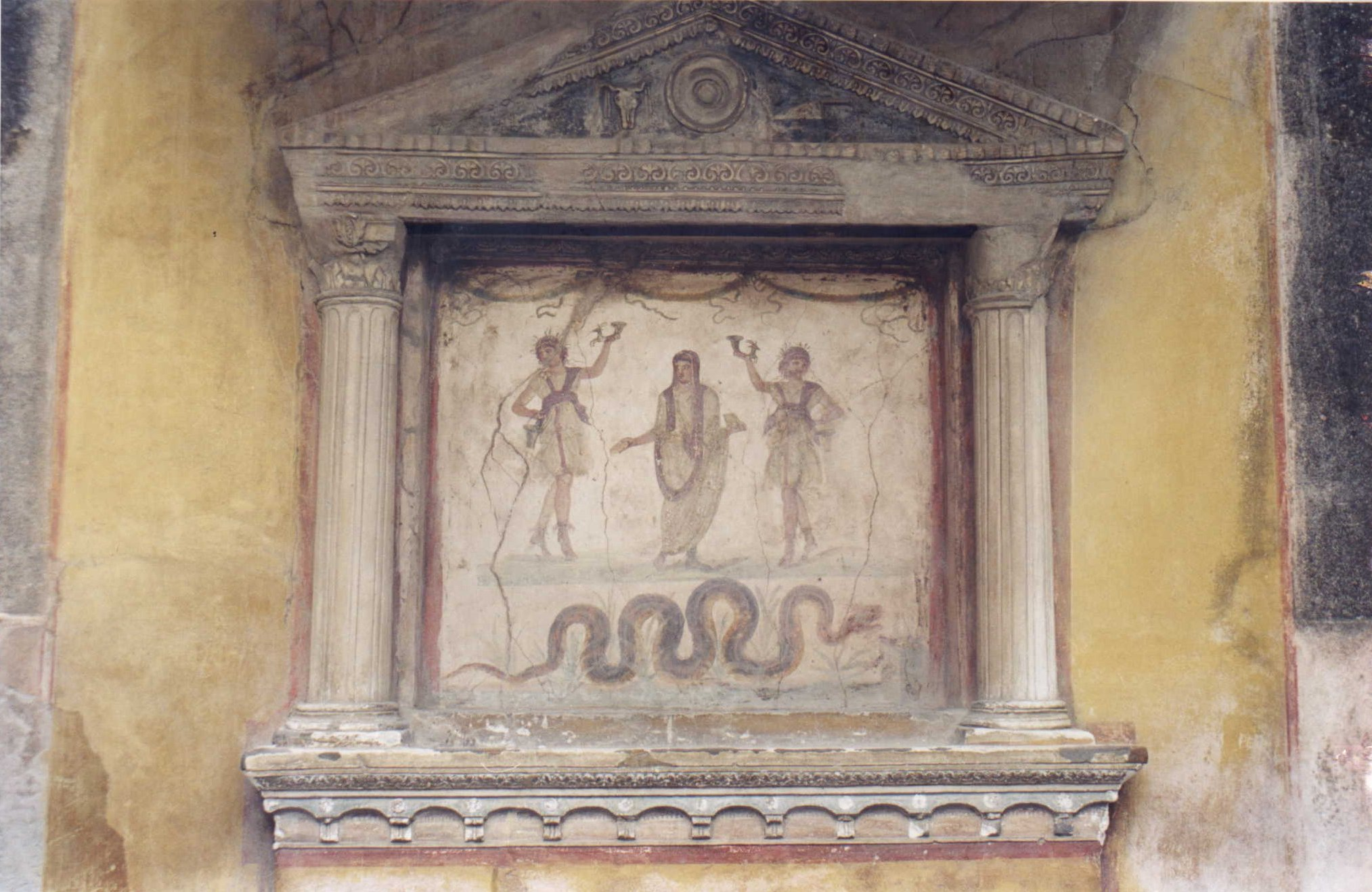
Lararium depicting tutelary deities of the house: the ancestral Genius (center) flanked by two Lares, with a guardian serpent below

Tutelary deities were also attached to sites of a much smaller scale, such as storerooms, crossroads, and granaries. Each Roman home had a set of protective deities: the Lar or Lares of the household or familia, whose shrine was a lararium; the Penates who guarded the storeroom (penus) of the innermost part of the house; Vesta, whose sacred site in each house was the hearth; and the Genius of the paterfamilias, the head of household. The poet Martial lists the tutelary deities who watch over various aspects of his farm. The architecture of a granary (horreum) featured niches for images of the tutelary deities, who might include the genius loci or guardian spirit of the site, Hercules, Silvanus, Fortuna Conservatrix ("Fortuna the Preserver") and in the Greek East Aphrodite and Agathe Tyche.

The Lares Compitales were the tutelary gods of a neighborhood (vicus), each of which had a compitum (shrine) devoted to these. Their annual public festival was the Compitalia. During the Republic, the cult of local or neighborhood tutelaries sometimes became rallying points for political and social unrest.

== African ==
- Ala - Igbo guardian deity of earth, women and children
- Mamba Muntu/ Mami Wata - Central and West African guardian spirit of the waters
- Nkisi - Bakongo spirits that inhabit objects to protect the person in possession of the objects
- Oriṣa - Yoruba deities that represent and govern various aspects of the universe
- Simbi - Bakongo spirits of ancestors that inhabit the waters or nature and protect their descendants

== Austronesian ==
- Atua
- Hanitu
- Hyang
- Kaitiaki
- Kawas (mythology)
- Tiki

== Buddhism ==
- Tibetan Buddhism has Yidam as a tutelary deity. Dakini is the patron of those who seek knowledge.

== Chinese folk religion ==
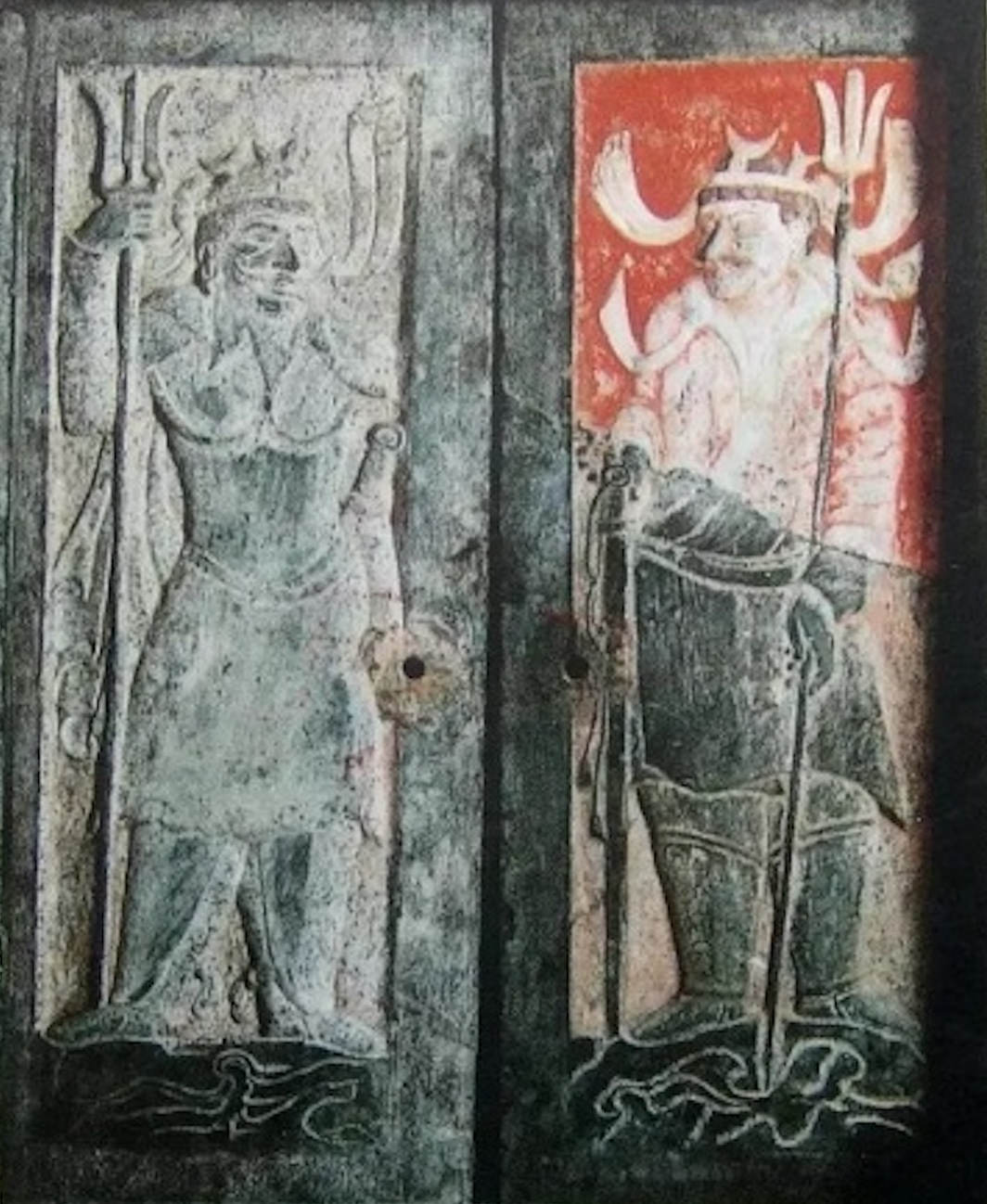
Stone doors of a tomb of the period of the Northern Dynasties to Tʻang Dynasty, excavated in Ching-pien County of the city of Yü-lin, Shensi Province. It shows two figures with tridents as the guardian deities of the tomb.

Chinese folk religion, both past and present, includes myriad tutelary deities. Exceptional individuals, highly cultivated sages, and prominent ancestors can be deified and honored after death. Lord Guan is the patron of military personnel and police, while Mazu is the patron of fishermen and sailors.

- Tudigong (Earth Deity) is the tutelary deity of a locality, and each individual locality has its own Earth Deity.
- Chenghuangshen (City God) is the guardian deity of individual city, worshipped by local officials and locals since imperial times.

== Christianity ==
A similar concept in Christianity would be the patron saint example of archangels "Michael, Gabriel, Raphael, etc." or to a lesser extent, the guardian angel.

== Germanic ==
- Fylgja
- Hamingja
- Landdisir
- Landvættir
- Vættir

== Hinduism ==
In Hinduism, personal tutelary deities are known as ishta-devata, while family tutelary deities are known as Kuladevata. Gramadevata are guardian deities of villages or regions. Devas can also be seen as tutelary. Shiva is patron of yogis and renunciants. City gods and goddesses include:

- Ma Dakshina Kali (Kalighat, Kolkata)
- Aai Mumbadevi (Mumbai)
- Sachchika (Osian)
- Mata Patan Devi (Patna)
- Sri Hattanath (Sylhet, Bangladesh)

Kuladevis include:

- Ambika (Porwad)
- Mahalakshmi
- Kal Bhairava is the protector of Ujjain
- Murugan is the protector of Kurinji (Hills).
- Padmanabhaswamy (Travancore)
- Meenakshi (Madurai)
- Guru Gorakhnath (Gorakhpur)

== Indonesian folk religion ==
Influenced by the religion of Islam, Indonesian people believe in jinn, particularly on the island of Java. Those jinn who adhere to the religion of Islam are generally benevolent, however, non-Muslim jinn are considered to be mischievous. Some of them guard graves. If a pilgrim approaching the grave has evil intentions, they would cause severe illness or even death.

Some of the prominent tutelary deities:

- Nyai Roro Kidul, Queen of Southern Sea
- Dewi Lanjar, Queen of the Northern Sea
- Dewi Sri, goddess of rice and fertility, popular among Javanese, Balinese and Sundanese

== Judaism ==
Spirits called shedim are mentioned twice in the Hebrew Bible. In both of these instances (Psalm 106:37 and Deuteronomy 32:17) the shedim are associated with child sacrifice or animal sacrifice. The term "shedim" is believed by some to be a loan-word from the Akkadian shedu, which referred to a spirit which could be either protective or malevolent.

== Korean shamanism ==
In Korean shamanism, jangseung and sotdae were placed at the edge of villages to frighten off demons. They were also worshiped as deities. Seonangshin is the patron deity of the village in Korean tradition and was believed to embody the Seonangdang.

== Meitei ==
In Meitei mythology and religion (Sanamahism) of Manipur, there are various types of tutelary deities, among which Lam Lais are the most predominant ones.

== Native American ==
- Tonás, tutelary animal spirit among the Zapotec.
- Totems, familial or clan spirits among the Ojibwe, can be animals.
- Apu, protector mountain deities in traditional Andean religion

== Philippine folk religion ==
In Philippine animism, Diwata or Lambana are deities or spirits that inhabit sacred places like mountains and mounds and serve as guardians.

- Maria Makiling is the deity who guards Mt. Makiling.
- Maria Cacao and Maria Sinukuan.

== Shinto ==
In Shinto, the spirits, or kami, which give life to human bodies come from nature and return to it after death. Ancestors are therefore themselves tutelaries to be worshiped.

== Slavic Europe ==
Several tutelary deities stem from Slavic Europe, for example: the leshy, who guarded a wood or a forest, and the domovoy, the tutelary spirit of hearth, home and family.

== Tai folk religion ==
Thai cities have tutelary city pillars and palladiums. The guardian spirit of a house is known as Chao Thi (เจ้าที่) or Phra Phum (พระภูมิ). Almost every traditional household in Thailand has a miniature shrine housing this tutelary deity, known as a spirit house.

== Turkic mythology ==
Although they are not necessarily subject to worship, İye are tutelary spirits which empower and protect from harm, in the legends of the Turkic peoples.

== Vietnamese folk religion ==
In Vietnamese folk religion, Thành hoàng are gods who protect and bring good things to the village.

== See also ==
- Dharmapāla
- Dvarapala
- Ethnic religion
- Eudaemon (mythology)
- Guardian angel
- Hiisi
- Genius loci
- Liminal deity
- Nagual
- National god
- Neoshamanism
- Patron saint
- Uay
