= Culture of Vietnam =

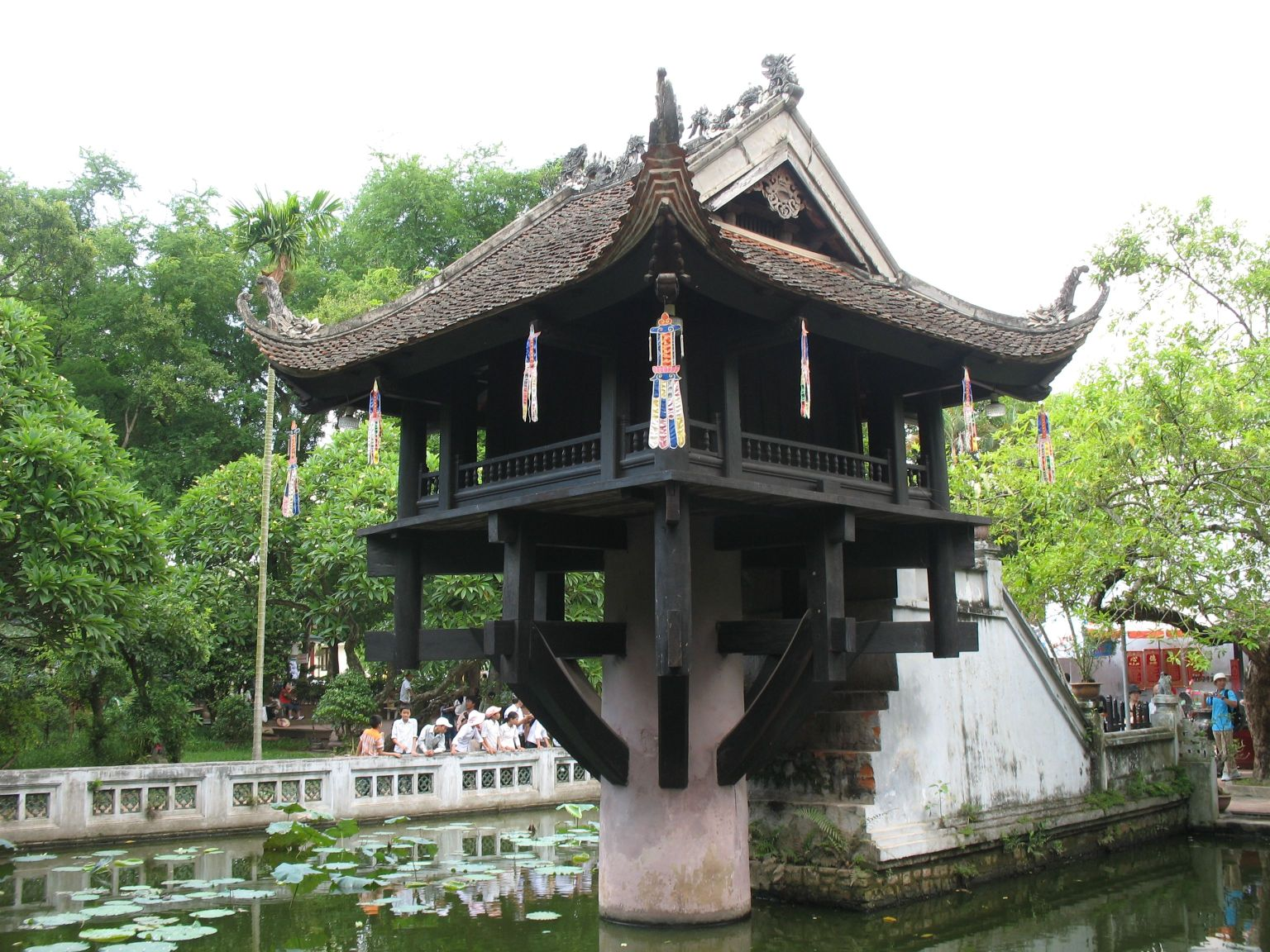
Buddhist architecture (seen here is the One Pillar Pagoda)

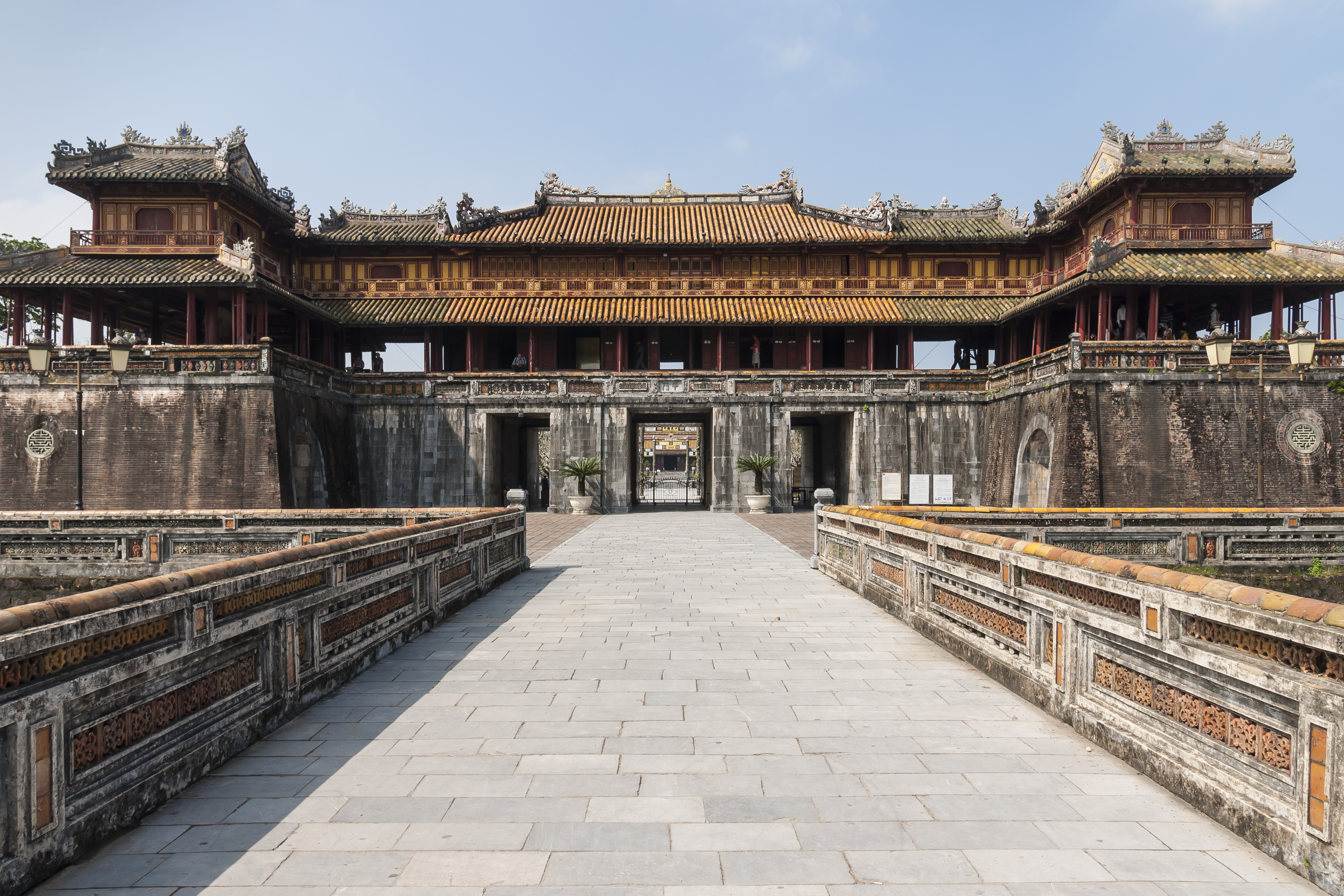
Imperial City in Huế, the former imperial capital

Five-colored festival flag

The cultures of Vietnam are the customs and traditions of the Viets and the other ethnic groups of Vietnam. Vietnam is part of Southeast Asia and the Sinosphere due to the influence of Chinese culture on Vietnamese culture.

Cultural artifacts, such as Dong Son drums were found spread throughout Southeast Asia and South China, suggesting a spread of Viet (Yue) culture all the way south to Indonesia. Vietnamese culture was also influenced by Chinese culture due to the "1000 years of Northern Rule" (111 BCE – 939 CE). From this period until the 19th century, Classical Chinese (Hán văn) was the language used for formal writing. Between the 15th and 19th centuries, literature and folk songs were written in the Vietnamese language using a Vietnamese script (chữ Nôm) derived from Chinese characters (chữ Hán).

Following independence from China in the 10th century, Vietnam began a southward expansion and annexed territories formerly belonging to Champa and Khmer, resulting in various influences on the Vietnamese. During the French colonial period, Catholicism, and a Latin script romanizing the Vietnamese language, the Vietnamese alphabet (Vietnamese: chữ Quốc Ngữ, lit. 'National Language Script'), were introduced in Vietnam.

Some elements considered to be characteristic of Vietnamese culture include ancestor veneration, respect for community and family, and living in harmony with nature.

== Language ==
While Vietnamese is set as the official language of Vietnam, there are more than 100 spoken languages in the country. They belong to five linguistic families: Austronesian, Austroasiatic, Hmong–Mien, Sino–Tibetan, and Kra–Dai.

== Literature ==
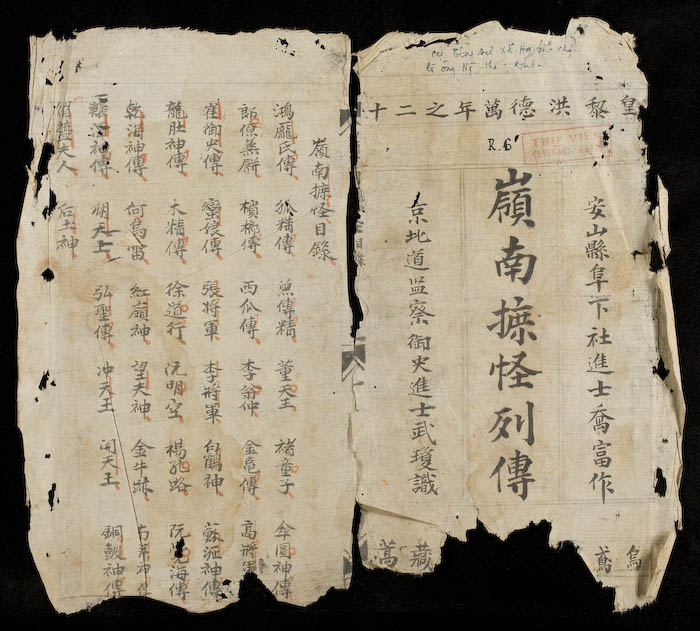
19th-century manuscript of "Mysterious tales of the Southern Realm" (Lĩnh Nam chích quái), a copy of 15th-century original tale.

The first evidence of writing in Vietnam appeared after the Han conquest of Nanyue (111 BC) with the introducing of Old Chinese and Classical Chinese in modern-day North and Central Vietnam. They, however, only had been materialized in form of fragments, short sentences engraved on bricks and coins. The first surviving literature in Vietnam is the Sanskrit Võ Cạnh inscription (4th century AD) near Nha Trang, which belongs to either Funan or Chamic culture. Following Võ Cạnh is the Old Cham Đông Yên Châu inscription near Trà Kiệu, dating from late 4th century, was erected by King Bhadravarman I of Champa, and was written in Old Southern Brahmic script. It remains today as the oldest attested epigraph of any Southeast Asian language, predating Mon, Khmer, Malay by centuries.

Modern Vietnamese fables have been introduced in English.

=== Poetry ===
Vietnam has had a range of cultural poetry throughout its history. Historically, Vietnamese poetry consists of three language traditions. Each poetry was written exclusively in Classical Chinese and later incorporated Sino-Vietnamese vocabulary. It was sometimes centered around the themes and traditions of Buddhism and Confucianism.

The chữ Nôm writing system for the Vietnamese language was adapted for poetry as well. This writing system was also supported by the Vietnamese government and recognized as the primary language of the nation. This changed upon the advent of foreign European rule with the introduction of the romanized script (known as chữ Quốc Ngữ) As a result, although the Latin alphabet provided literacy and access to the Vietnamese language in terms of oral and written literacy, the precise meaning and beauty of Vietnamese poems in Hán-Nôm may have gotten lost in the translation process to the Latin alphabet of chữ Quốc Ngữ.

== Visual arts ==
Traditional Vietnamese art is a part of art practiced in Vietnam or by Vietnamese artists, from ancient times (including the elaborate Đông Sơn drums) to post-Chinese domination art which was influenced by Chinese Buddhist art, and Taoism and Confucianism. The art of Champa and France also played a smaller role later on.

The Chinese influence on Vietnamese art extends into Vietnamese pottery and ceramics, calligraphy, and traditional architecture.

=== Calligraphy ===
Calligraphy previously used chữ Hán along with chữ Nôm. Most modern Vietnamese calligraphy instead uses the Roman-character based Viẹtnamese alphabet.

In the past, when literacy in the old character-based writing systems of were restricted to Vietnamese scholars, calligraphy still played a part in Vietnamese life. On special occasions such as Lunar New Year, people would go to scholars to make them a calligraphy hanging.

=== Silk painting ===
Vietnamese silk painting is favored for the mystical atmosphere that can be achieved with the medium. During the 19th and 20th centuries, French influence was absorbed into Vietnamese art and the liberal and modern use of color especially began to differentiate Vietnamese silk paintings from their Chinese, Japanese and Korean counterparts.

=== Woodblock prints ===
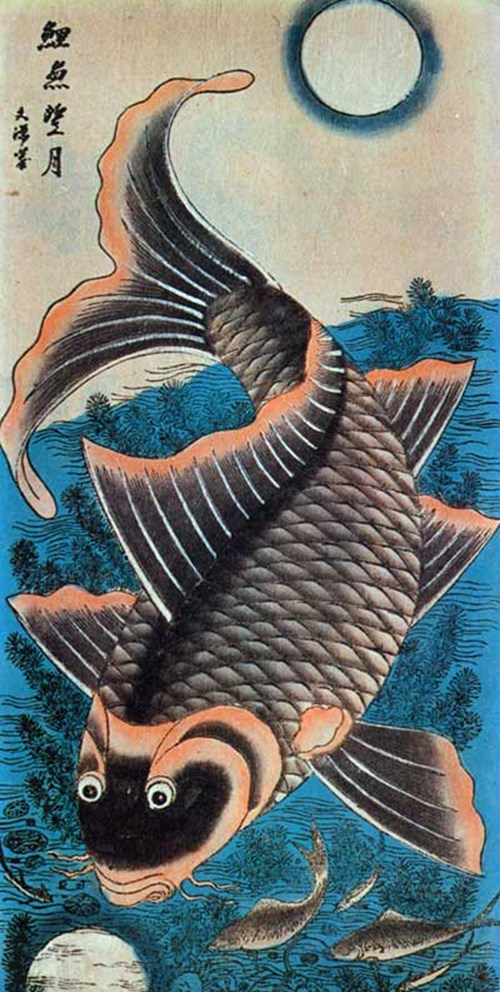
Đông Hồ folk woodblock print of a carp

A folk art with a history in Vietnam, Vietnamese woodblock prints have reached a level of popularity outside of Vietnam. Organic materials are used to make the paint, which is applied to wood and pressed on paper. The process is repeated with different colors.

== Cuisine ==
Vietnamese cuisine is divided into three main categories, each pertaining to Vietnam's three main regions (north, central and south). It uses less oil and more vegetables, and is mainly based on rice and fish sauce. Its characteristic flavors are sweet (sugar), spicy (Bird's eye chili), sour (lime), nước mắm (fish sauce), and flavored by a variety of mint and basil.

Vietnam also has a variety of noodles and noodle soups. Regions invented typically different types of noodles, varying in shapes, tastes, colors, etc. One of the country's type of noodles is phở (Vietnamese pronunciation: [fəː˧˩]), a type of noodle soup originating in North Vietnam, which consists of rice noodles and beef soup (sometimes chicken soup) with other ingredients such as bean sprouts and scallions (spring onions). The boiling stock, fragrant with spices and sauces, is poured over the noodles and vegetables, poaching the paper-thin slices of raw beef just before serving. Phở is meant to be savored, incorporating flavors: the sweet flavour of beef, sour lemons, salty fish sauce, and fresh vegetables.

Chopsticks (Vietnamese: đũa, chữ Nôm: 𥮊 or 𥯖) are an utensil in Vietnam.

== Religion & philosophy ==
Besides folk religion, religion in Vietnam has historically been a mix of Buddhism, Confucianism, and Taoism, known in Vietnamese as the Tam Giáo ("the three religions"). Scholars have provided empirical evidence on the existence of the socio-cultural phenomenon called "cultural additivity" in Vietnamese history and society. Some elements considered to be unique of Vietnamese culture include ancestor veneration and respect for community and family.

Catholicism is also practiced in Vietnam.

The three folk practices that are considered to be important or common amongst the Viets may include:

- Ancestor worship and filial piety is more commonly practised amongst the older generation of Vietnamese. Some Vietnamese, regardless of religious denomination, practice ancestor worship and have an ancestor altar at their home or business.
- Đạo Mẫu, or the worship of mother goddesses, was established in Vietnam in the 16th century and draws together disparate beliefs and practices.

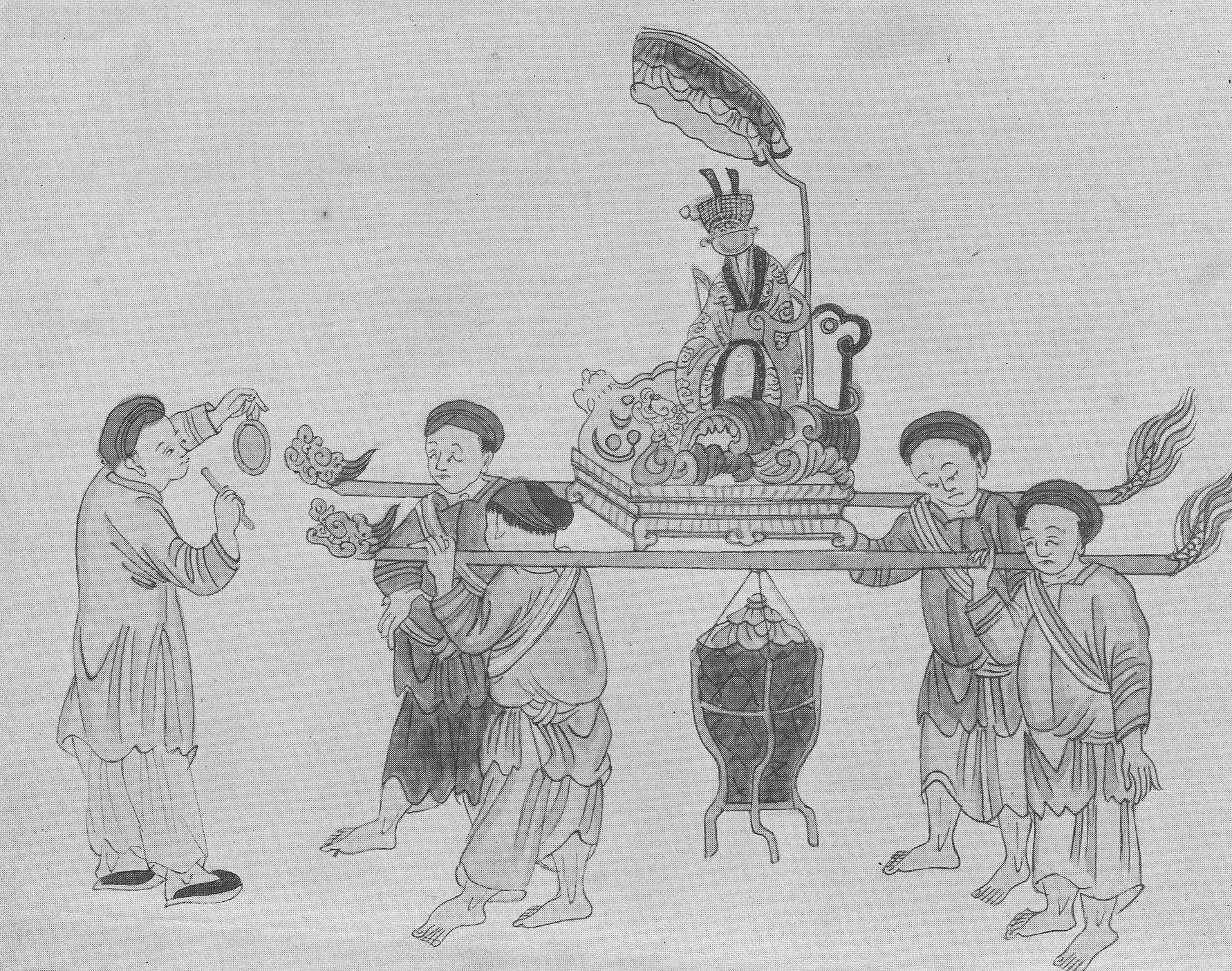
Ceremonial procession of Thành hoàng, 19th century

- Thành hoàng refers to the deities that is enshrined in each village's đình in Vietnam. The deities are believed to guard the village against disasters such as natural disasters or crises and bring fortune.

== Clothing ==
After the Ming conquest of Vietnam, Ming-style clothing was imposed by a Ming official within a month. Due to the previous centuries of conflict between China and Vietnam, Ming administrators said that their mission was to attempt to "civilize" the unorthodox Vietnamese "barbarians".

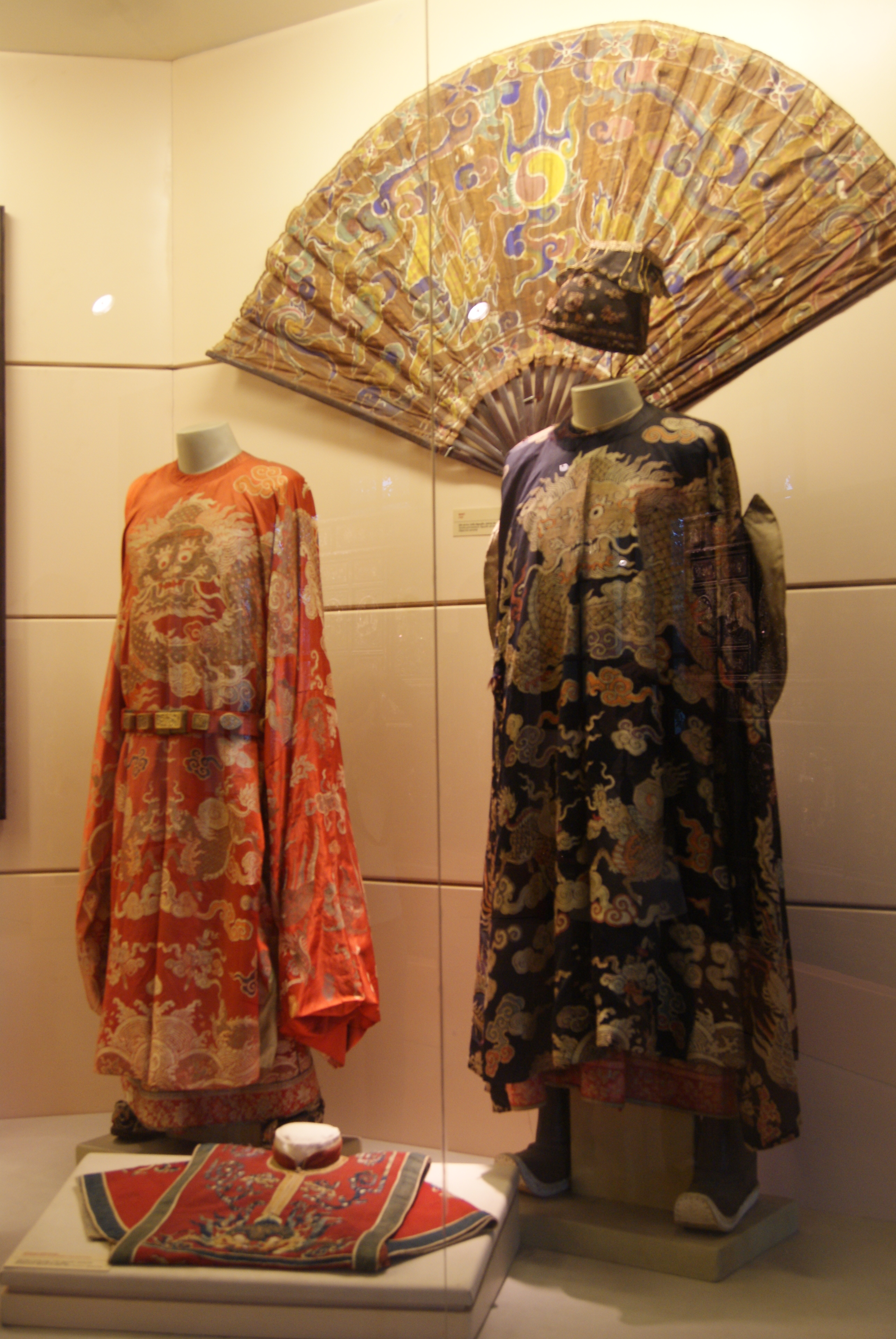
Court attires of Nguyễn Dynasty

The áo tràng vạt was a traditional cross-collared robe worn by Viets before the 19th century. During the Nguyễn dynasty, it was replaced by the áo ngũ thân and became obsolete.

== Kinship ==
Communication culture in traditional Vietnamese families tends to follow the top-down stereotype. Vietnamese people transmit the family culture through teach communication. The three core relationships in the Vietnamese society are king – people, father – child, wife – husband. The father – child, wife – husband relationship shows that the father has the biggest role and position in the family. Later, the father – child relationship has started to transition into a parent child relationship as both parents have equal influence on their children.

== Feudal eras ==
=== Pre-Sinicization Nanyue ===
Prior to Han Chinese migration from the north, the Yue tribes cultivated wet rice, practiced fishing and slash-and-burn agriculture, domesticated water buffalo, built stilt houses, tattooed their faces, and dominated the coastal regions from shores all the way to the fertile valleys in the interior mountains. They also practiced teeth blackening. The Yue became advanced in shipbuilding and developed maritime warfare technology mapping trade routes to Eastern coasts of China and Southeast Asia.

The ancient Han Chinese referred to the tribal groups of people living in southern China and northern Vietnam as the Baiyue people (a group that existed from 1000 BC to 1000 AD), saying that they possessed habits like adapting to water, having their hair cropped short, and possessing body tattoos. The ancient Northern Yue are considered one of the progenitor groups of modern Lingnan culture (Cantonese culture), while the Southern Yue people are considered one of the progenitor groups of modern Vietnamese culture. Ancient Han Chinese had described ancient Yue people occupying Nanyue as barbaric, comparing their language to animal shrieking and had regarded them as lacking morals and modesty.

=== Ming rule ===
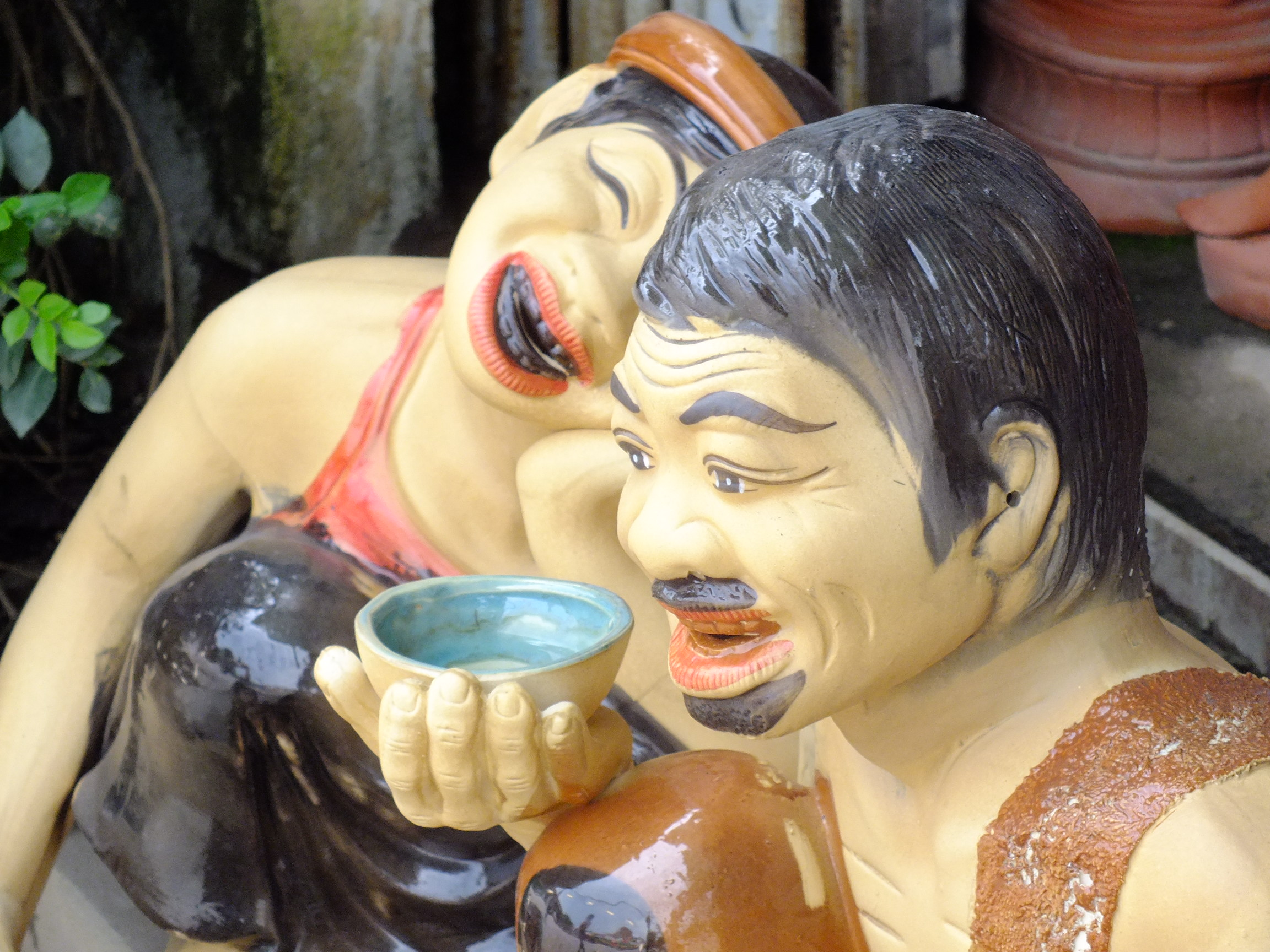
Vietnamese statues depicting the traditional practice of teeth blackening (nhuộm răng đen)

During the Ming rule of Vietnam after the Ming–Hồ War, the Vietnamese were ordered to stop growing their hair long, switch to Han Chinese style clothing, and stop the practice of teeth blackening so that they could have white teeth and long hair like the Chinese.

=== Later cultural relations with neighbors ===
A royal edict was issued by the Lê dynasty in 1474 forbidding Vietnamese from adopting foreign languages, hairstyles and clothing of the Lao, Champa or the "Northerners" which referred to the Ming. The edict was recorded in the 1479 Complete Chronicle of Dai Viet (Ngô Sĩ Liên).

According to Nayan Chanda, the Vietnamese had adopted Sinocentric views towards their surrounding neighbors such as the Chams and Cambodians, and considered non-Sinospheric cultures as barbaric. David G. Marr noted that a possible reason for social stratification, such as with the Montagnards and the Việts, were that other ethnic groups did not share the same passion for wet-rice cultivation as the Viets did.

By the Nguyễn dynasty the Vietnamese themselves were ordering Cambodian Khmer to adopt Han culture style by ceasing habits like cropping hair and ordering them to grow it long besides making them replace skirts with trousers. Han Chinese Ming dynasty refugees numbering 3,000 came to Vietnam at the end of the Ming dynasty. They opposed the Qing dynasty and were loyal to the Ming dynasty. Their descendants became known as Minh Hương. They did not wear Manchu hairstyle unlike later Chinese migrants to Vietnam during the Qing dynasty.

The Lingnan and historical Northern Vietnamese cultures are similar in possessing Nanyue and Han Chinese culture.

== See also ==
- List of libraries in Vietnam
- List of museums in Vietnam
- Media of Vietnam
- Social issues in Vietnam
- Vietnamese mythology
- Vietnamese name
- Vietnamese studies
