= Seonangdang =

Holy cairns and trees in Korea

- Hangul: 서낭당
- Revised Romanization: Seonangdang
- McCune–Reischauer: Sŏnangdang

Alternative name
- Hangul: 성황당
- Hanja: 城隍堂
- Revised Romanization: Seonghwangdang
- McCune–Reischauer: Sŏnghwangdang

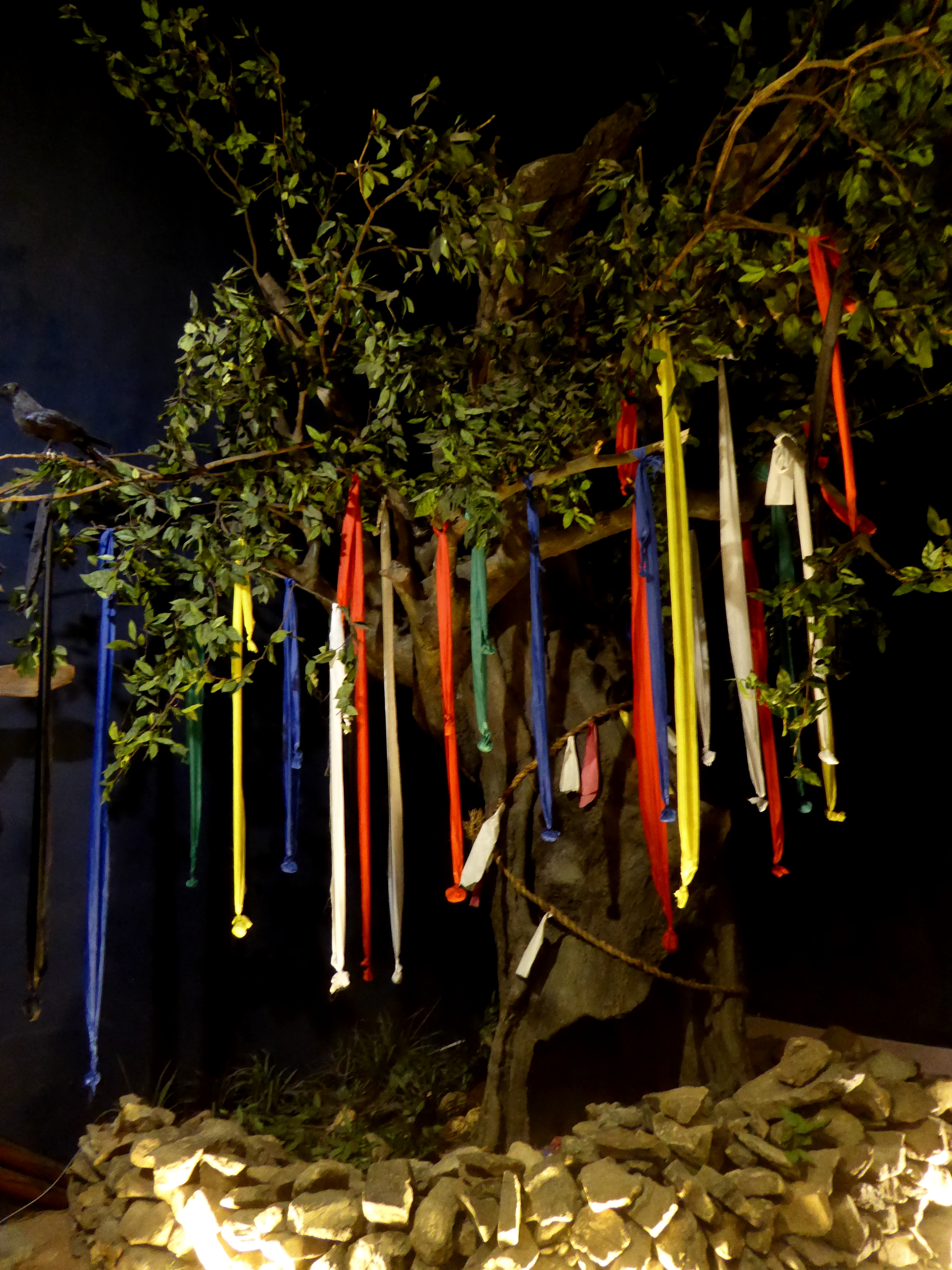
Model seonangdang tree, Lotte World Folk Museum, Seoul.

The seonangdang (Korean: 서낭당), also known as the seonghwangdang (성황당; 城隍堂) are stone cairns or trees that are considered holy and are dedicated to the deity Seonangshin, the patron of villages. The seonangdang are common in mountainous settlements of the Korean Peninsula.

== History ==
The origins of the seonangdang are unclear; archaeologists and historians have two theories.

The first theory is that seonangdangs originated in Korea. According to these historians, the seonangdangs originated as border marks between various villages. As the concept of religion developed, these borders became worshipped as the homes of the border deities, equivalent to the Roman deity of Terminus. These historians equate seonangdangs with the Sodo, a holy area in the Proto–Three Kingdoms of Korea. Other historians claim that seonangdangs developed as altars to Sanwang, the deities of mountains.

The other theory is that seonangdangs are the Korean variety of Ovoo, or Mongolian stone towers. The Mongolian worship of Ovoo are strikingly similar to the Korean worship of seonangdang in that it is of stone, and is believed to grant the wishes of travelers. According to this theory, the seonangdang cult followed the Mongol invasions of Korea, in the thirteenth century. However, there are records of seonangdang before that.

The first record of a seonangdang is in the Goryeosa, a history book written about the Goryeo Dynasty in the 15th century. According to the book, in the reign of King Munjong of Goryeo, a 'Seonghwangsa', meaning 'Temple of Seonghwang', was constructed. In the Goryeo Dynasty, the best-known seonangdang was in the town of Jeonju. King Gojong believed that the many defeats of the Mongols in the Mongol invasions of Korea were because the Seonangshin aided the Koreans.

As one of the best-known deities to the Sangmin, or commoners, the Seonangshin were respected during the subsequent Joseon Dynasty. The Joseon government split the Seonangshin into two categories; the official Gukhaeng Seonang, the patrons of the state, and the private Seonang, the village patrons.

The Joseon Dynasty rulers officially held rites in seonangdangs. After usurping the Goryeo Dynasty with a coup, King Taejo of Joseon held ceremonies in the Seonangdang all throughout the Korean Peninsula. King Taejong of Joseon honored the seonangdangs of Baekak and Songak (Gaeseong).

== Appearance and location ==
Seonangdangs were located on the hills or ridges near the village. There are five varieties of seonangdang;

1. The most common form of seonangdang is a stone tower located next to or around a large tree. The tree was called the Shinmok (Holy Tree), where a Gut (a shamanistic ritual) was held.
2. Another form of seonangdang was just a stone tower with no tree. This is generally regarded to be a modified form of the seonangdang with a Shinmok, where the tower developed before the tree.
3. The third form of seonangdang had no stone tower, but just the Seonang Namu, a tree that served as the house of Seonangshin. The tree was decorated with white or five-colored (red, yellow, white, blue, green) strips of silk, each equivalent to the cardinal directions. The Seonang Namu is regarded to be the same as the Shinmok.
4. This variety was widespread in Gangwon Province. There was no stone tower, but an actual house that was considered to be the residence of Seonangshin. This house was called the Dangjib, or the 'temple house'. The Dangjibs were traditionally made of wood with a tiled roof; Seonghwang Jishinwi (Hanja: 城隍之神位), meaning 'Here be Seonang'.
5. The last, southern variety was a vertically upright natural stone, up to 2 meters high and 120 centimeters wide.

== Worship ==
The official government of Korea held jesa, or ceremonies, in seonangdangs both regularly and at times of droughts and wars.

In villages, both shamans and housewives prayed in seonangdangs, but most of those who prayed at seonangdangs were travelers and wanderers. On trails, travelers and wanderers placed three additional stones on the tower, and prayed for safety on the path, as it was believed that the deity would protect the travelers. Thus, seonangdangs on popular trails could be extremely large and tall.

== See also ==
- Bangsatap
- Jangseung
