= Vietnamese communal house =

Type of building in villages in Vietnam

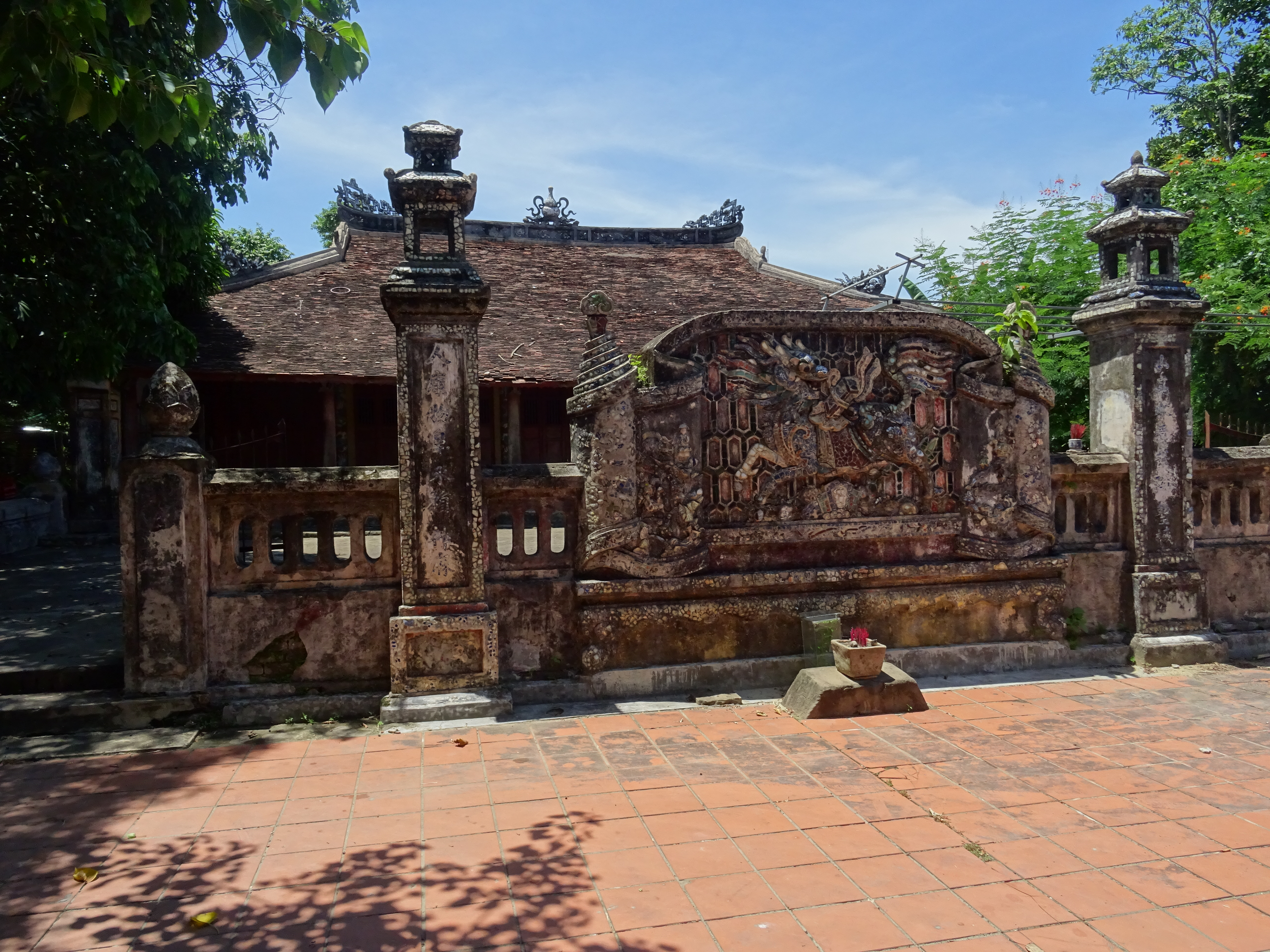
Đình Kim Long, Huế

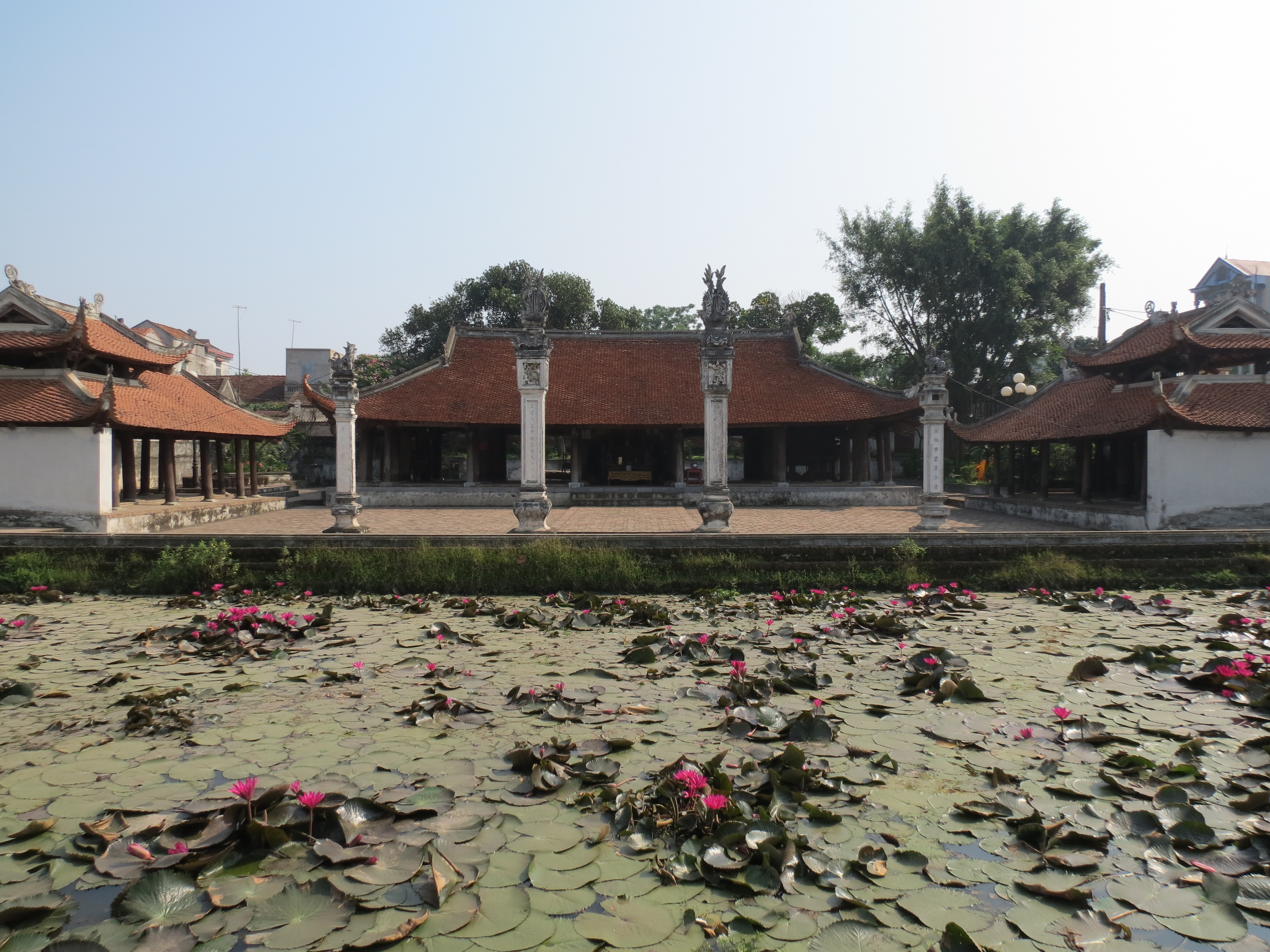
Đình Tây Đằng, Hanoi

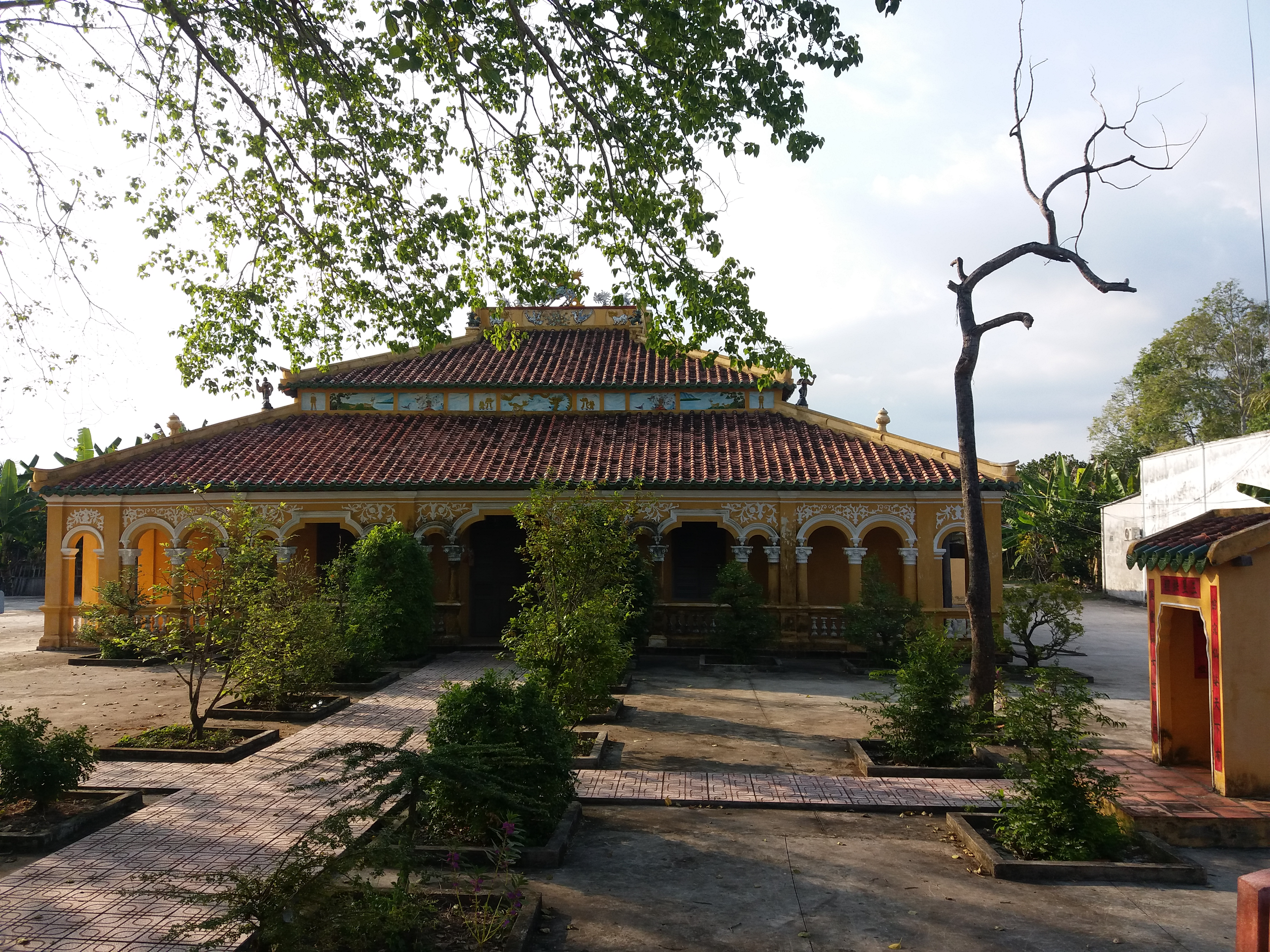
Đình Mỹ Lương, Mỹ Lương commune, Cái Bè district, Tiền Giang

Đình (Chữ Hán: 亭 or 庭) or Vietnamese communal houses are traditional buildings found in Vietnamese villages, dedicated to the honoring of thành hoàng, national / local figures and heroes. Vietnamese communal houses also serve as a meeting place of the people in a local community, akin to modern civic centers.

== Gallery ==
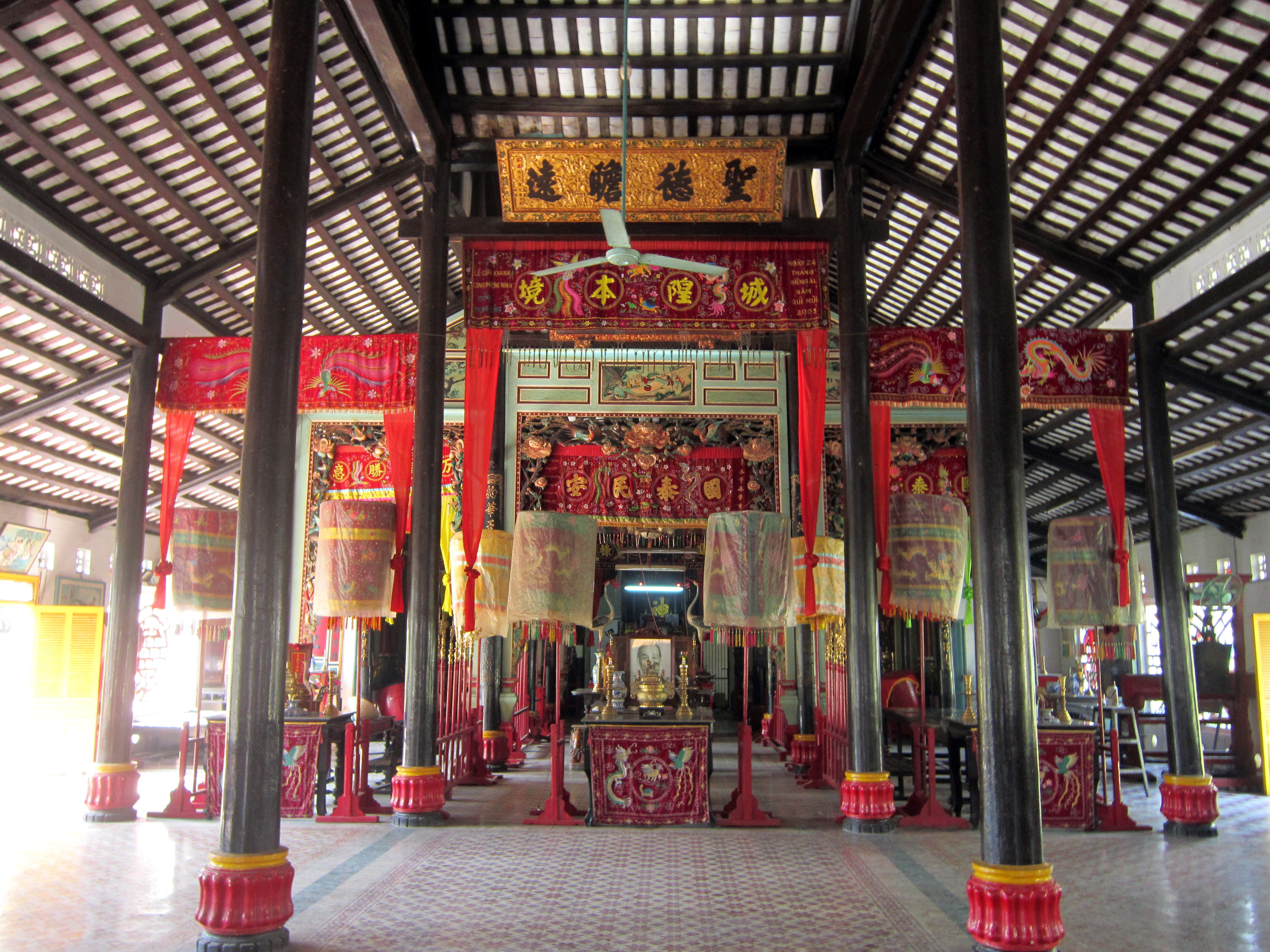
Interior of Đình Mỹ Phước

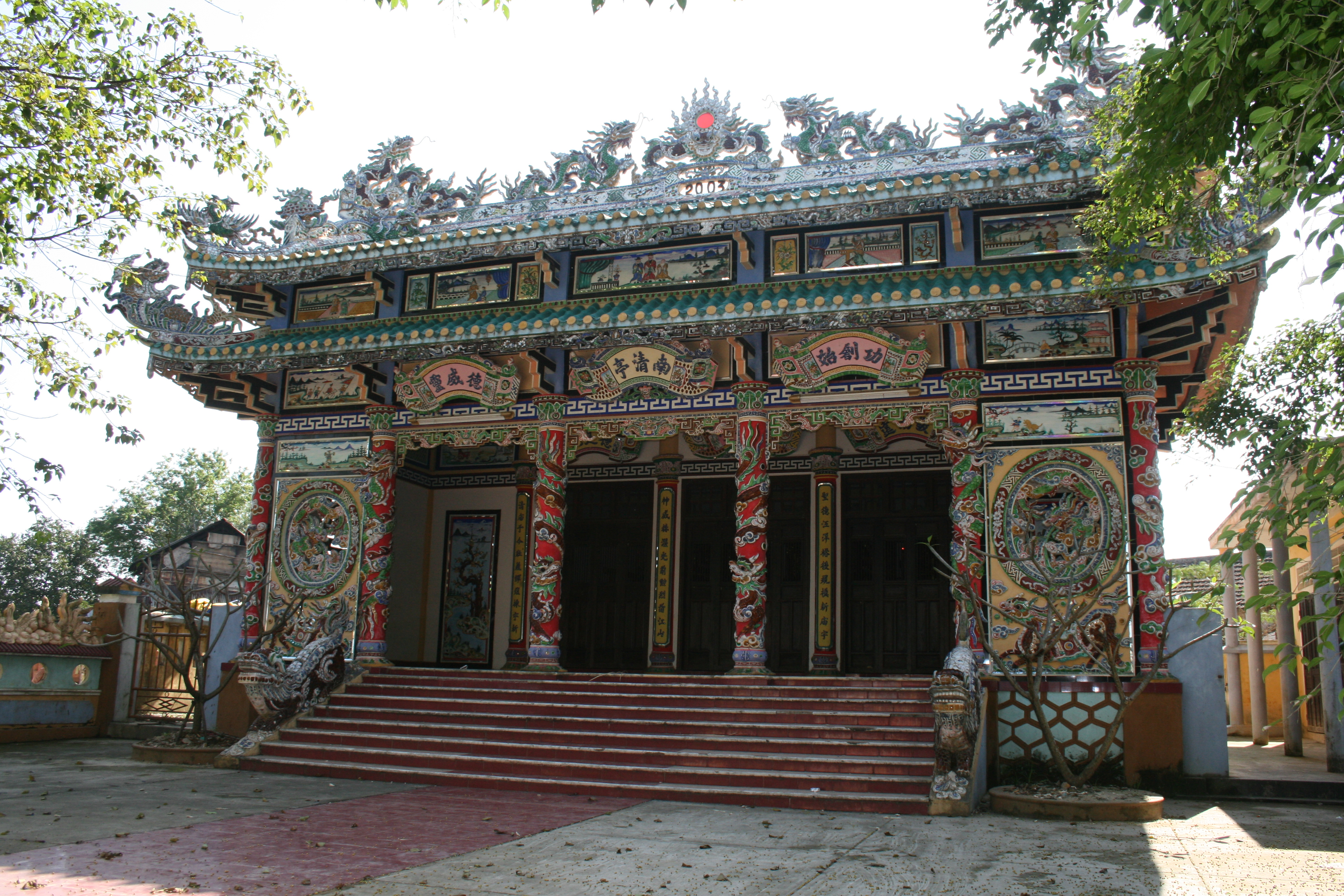
Đình Nam Thanh in Huế

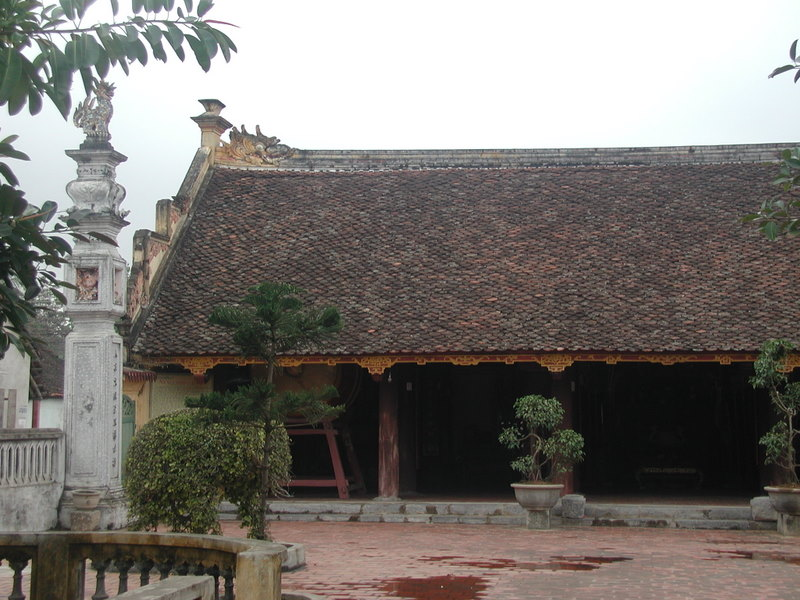
Đình Bảng Môn in Thanh Hóa Province

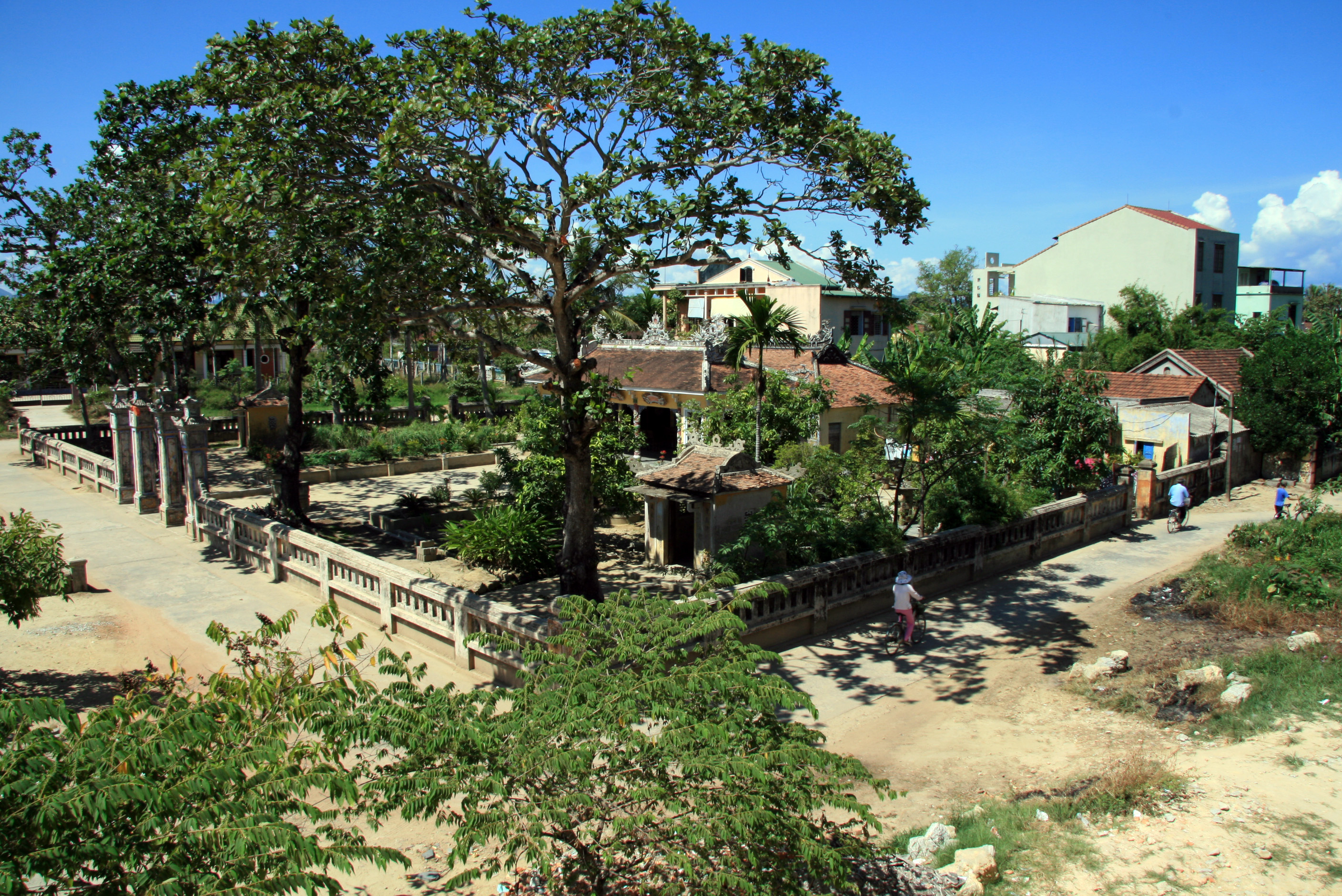
Đình Vỹ Dạ in Huế

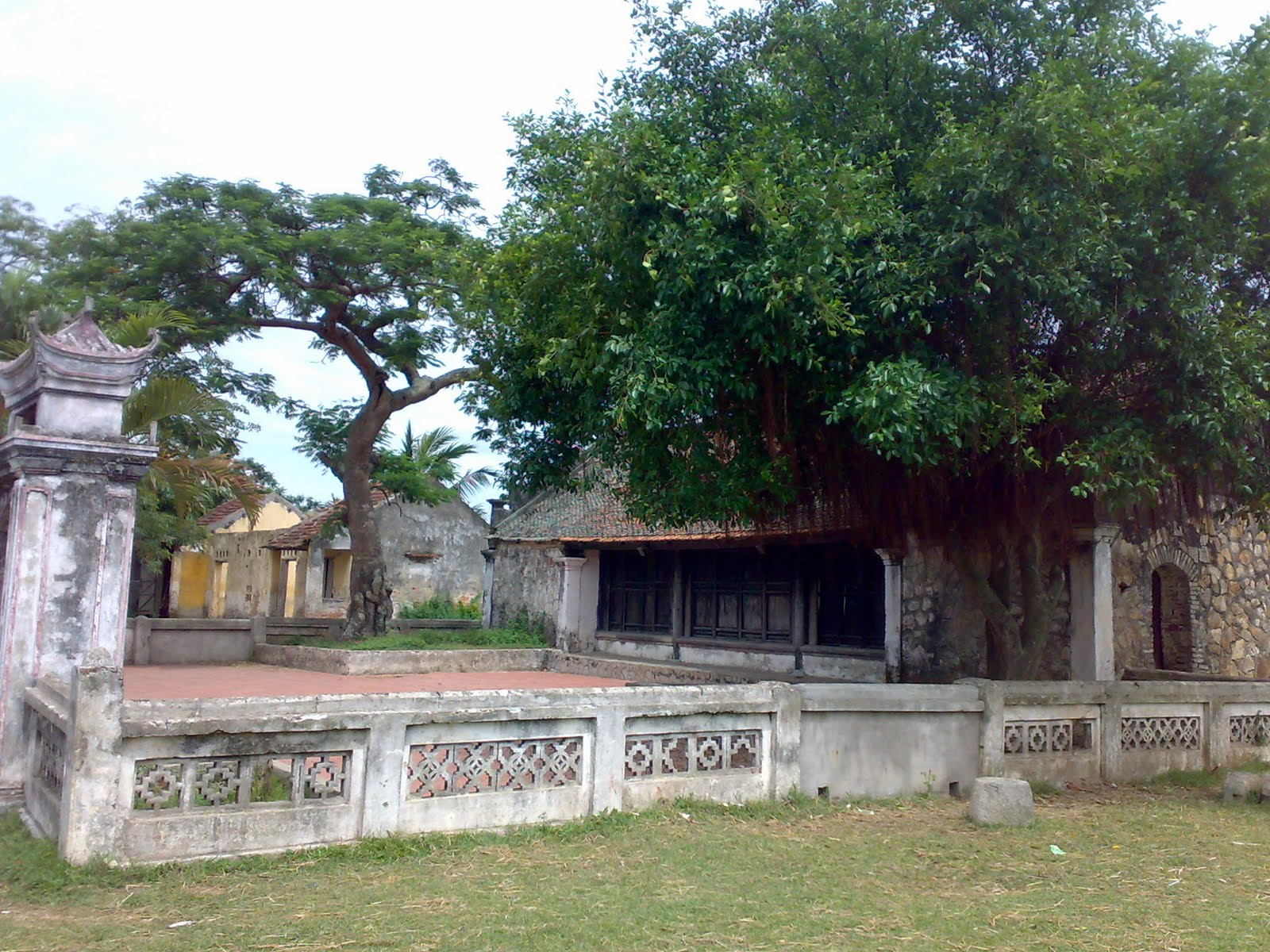
Đình Tử Đôi, Hải Phòng

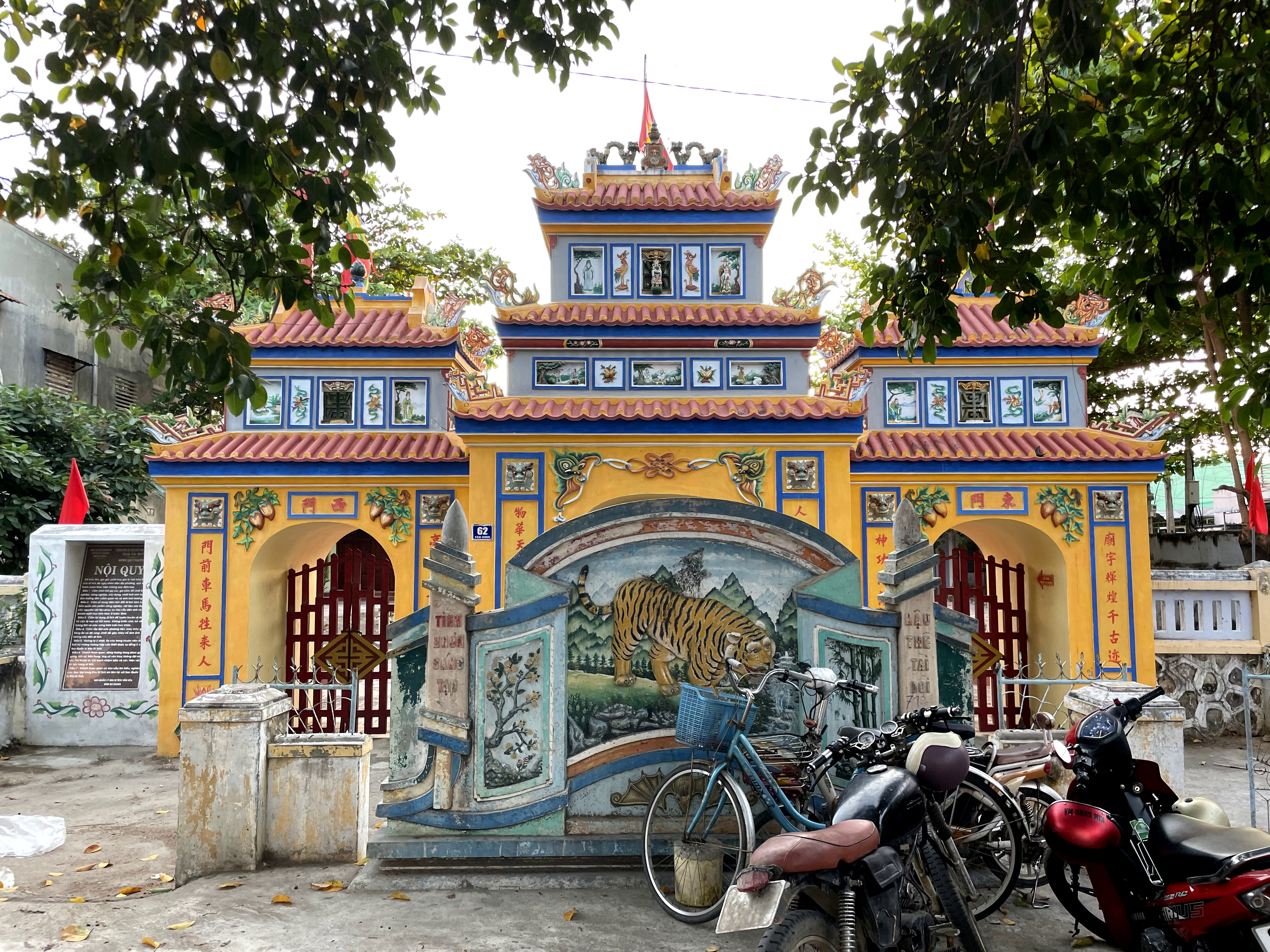
Đình Dư Khánh, Ninh Thuận

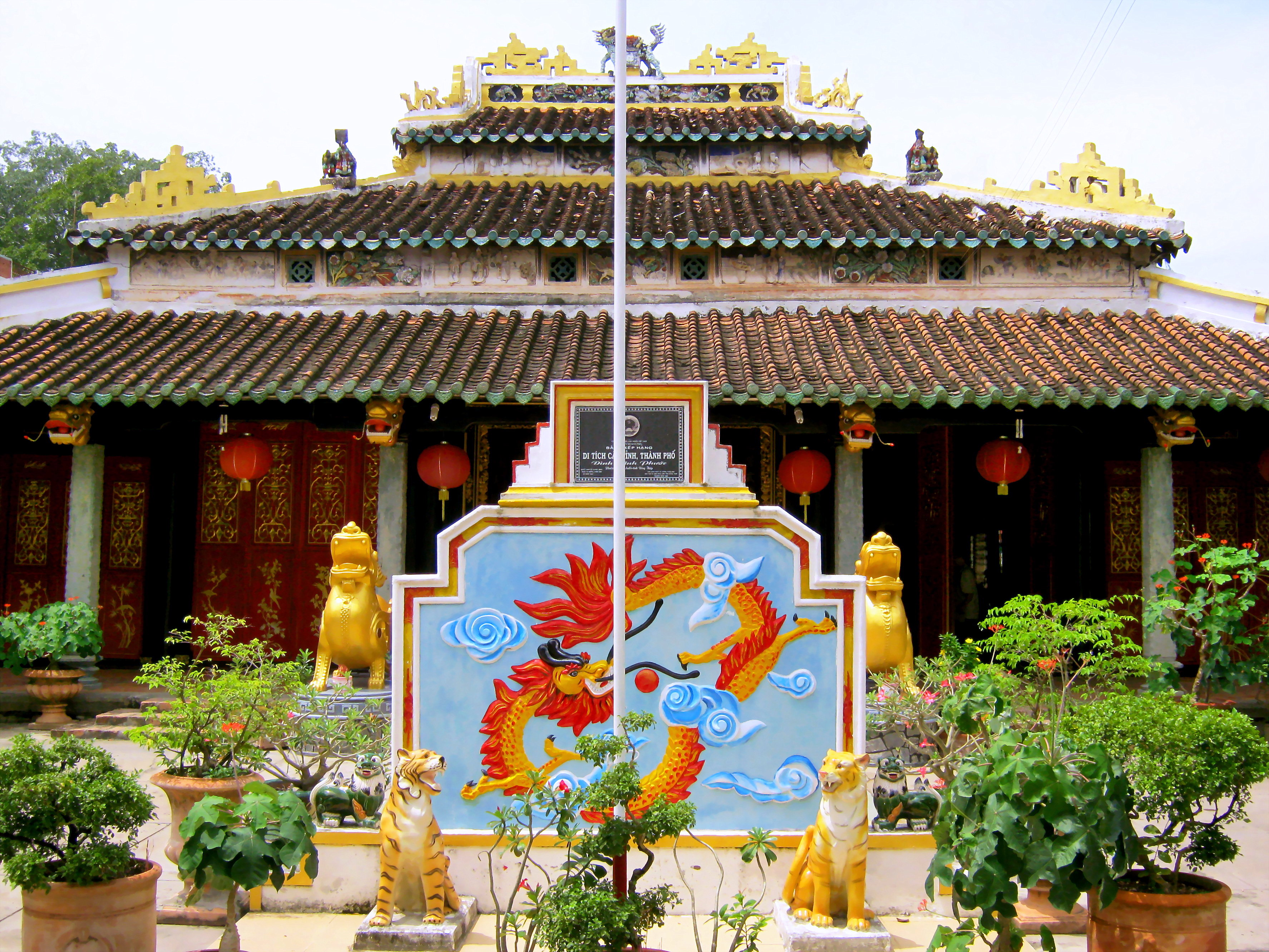
Đình Vĩnh Phước, Sa Đéc, Đồng Tháp

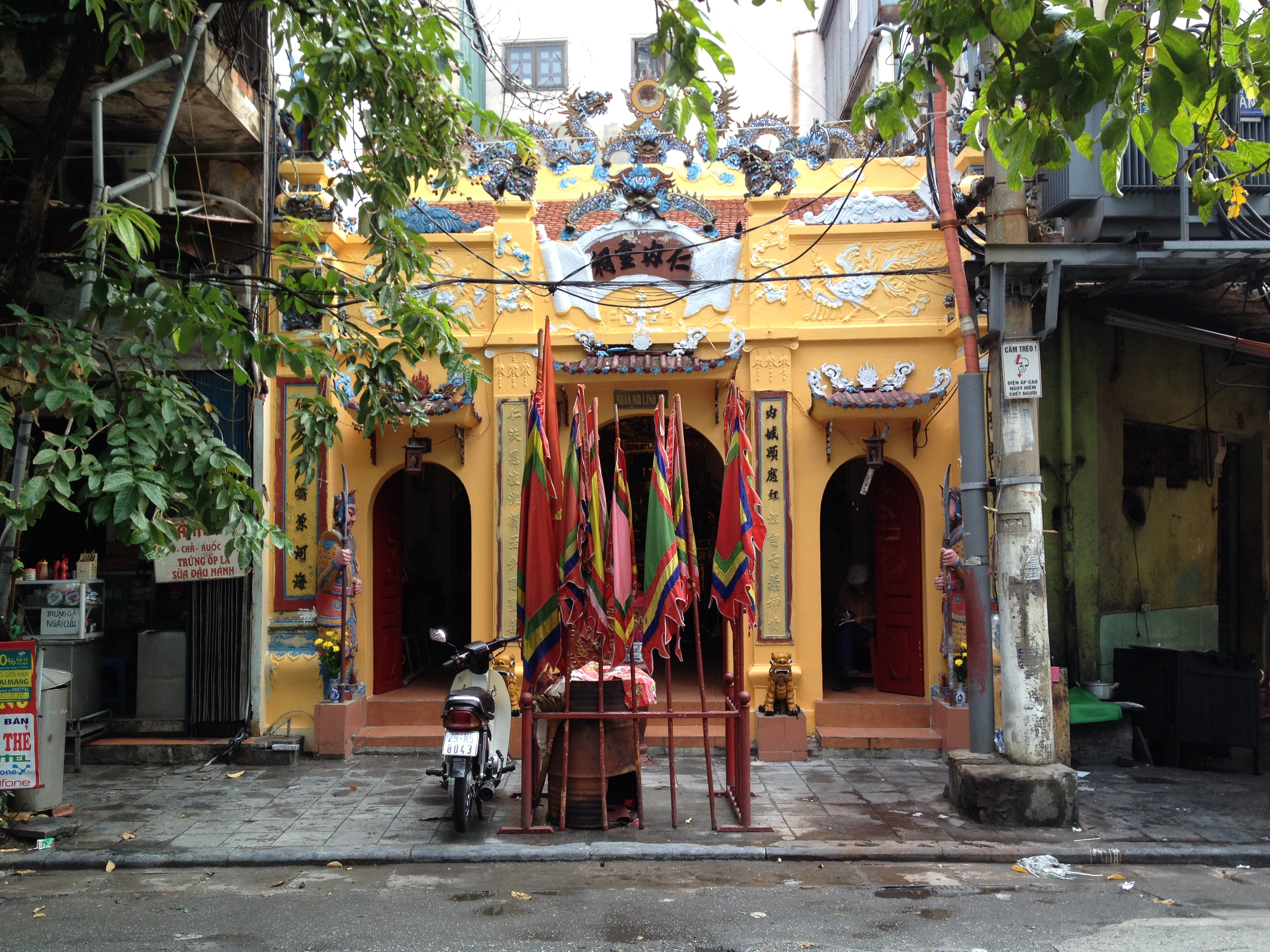
Đình Nhân Nội Linh Từ, 33 Bát Đàn, Hanoi

== See also ==
- The dictionary definition of đình at Wiktionary
