= Thành hoàng =

Vietnamese tutelary gods of villages

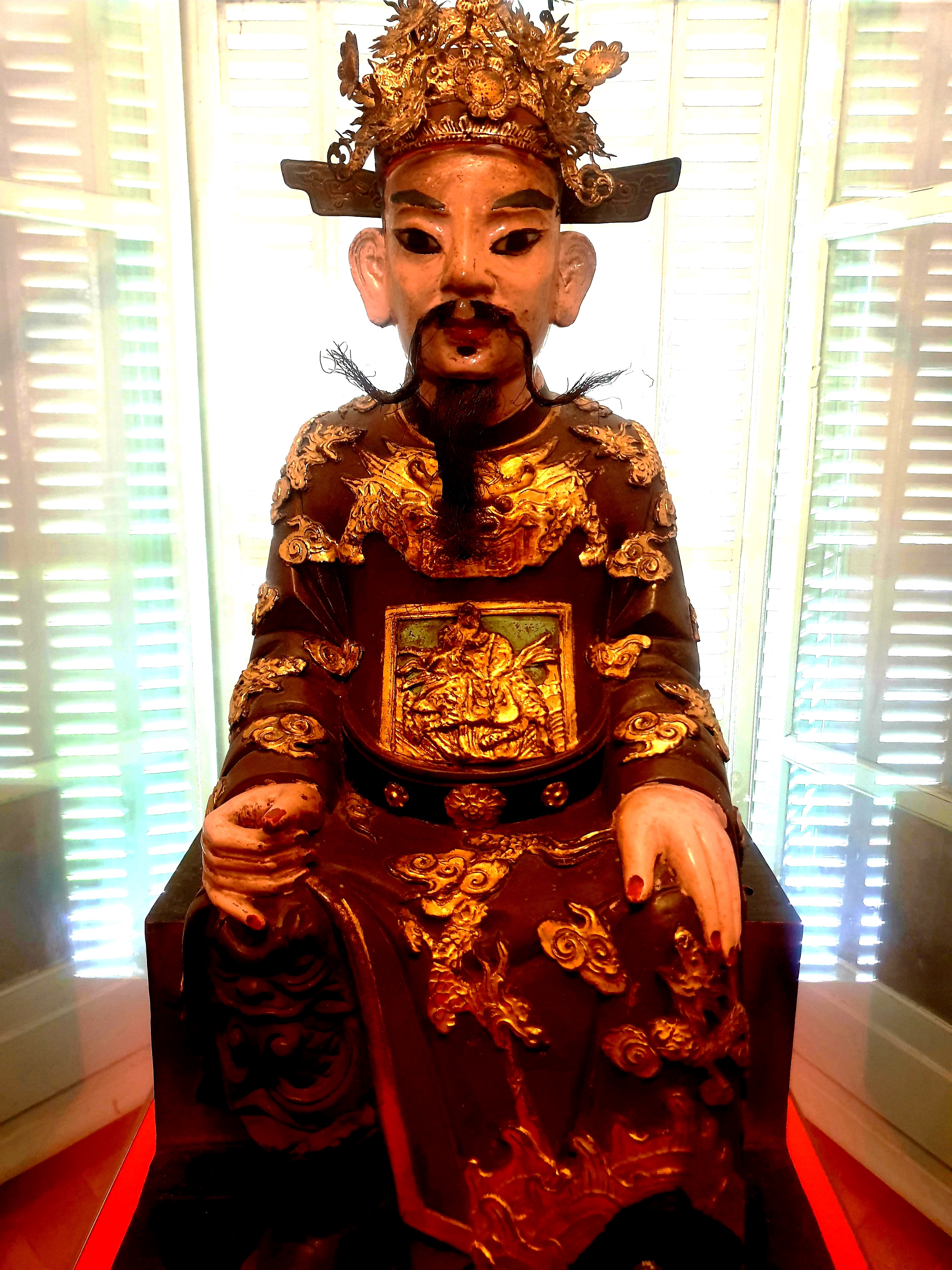
- Statue of a Thành hoàng in northern Vietnam
- Vietnamese alphabet: Thành hoàng
- Chữ Hán: 城隍

Thành hoàng (chữ Hán: 城隍) or Thần hoàng (神隍), Thần Thành hoàng (神城隍) refers to the gods or deities that are enshrined in each village's Đình in Vietnam. The gods or deities are believed to protect the village from natural disasters or calamities and bring fortune.

== Etymology ==
thành hoàng is a Sino-Vietnamese word, literally referring to the city wall and the moat that surrounds it. It is also the Vietnamese pronunciation of Chinese Chénghuáng (or City God), which was adopted from Taoism.

== Origin ==
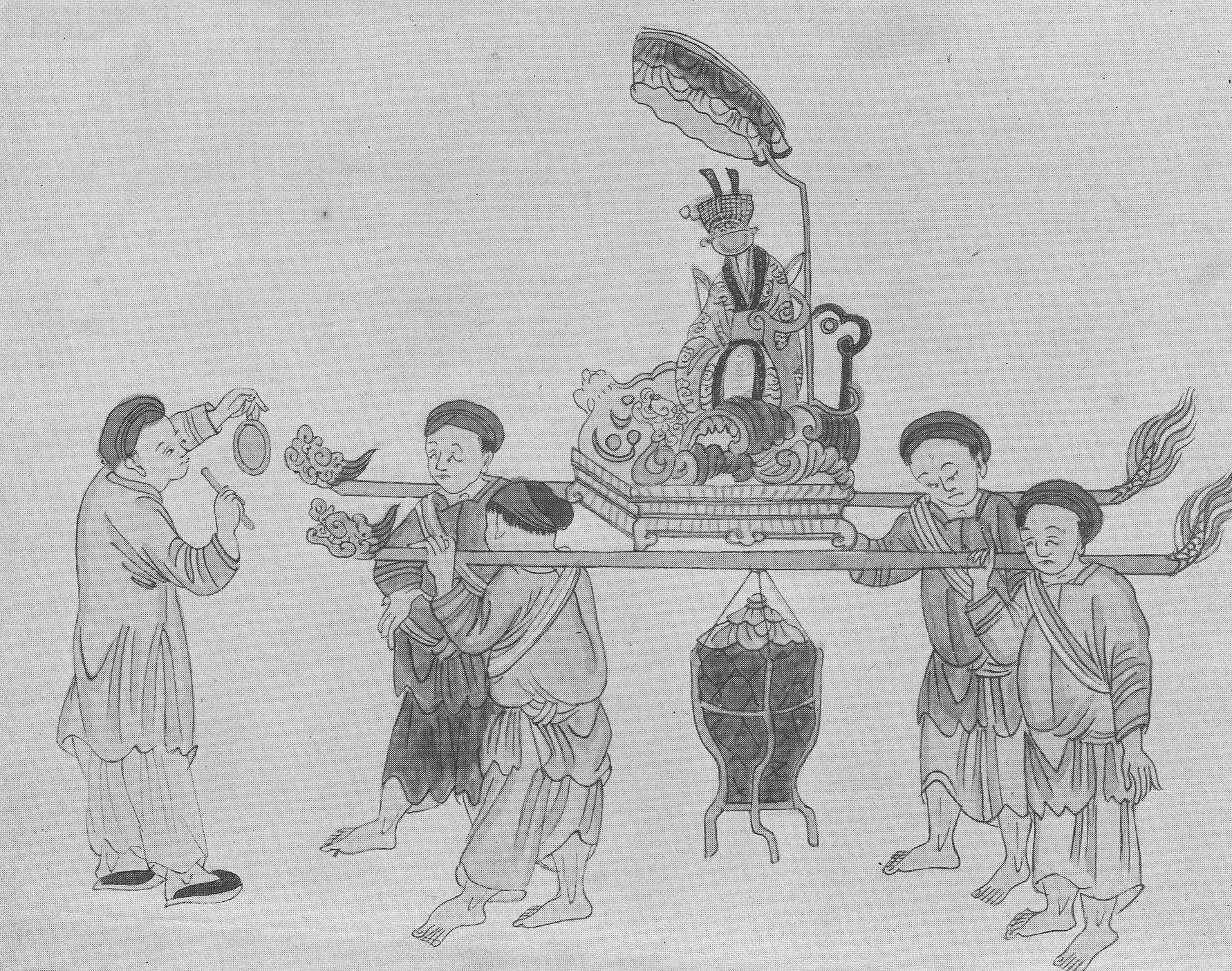
Ceremonial procession of Thành hoàng, 19th century

No later than Đinh dynasty, each locality started to worship the mountain and river gods that ruled over a domain which encompassed their village. Later on, the government decreed the deification of late national heroes, righteous officials and loyal subjects, and specific localities were chosen to exalt these gods. Gradually other common folks took up the practice and worshipped their own gods to be blessed with protection and fortune.

== Ranking ==
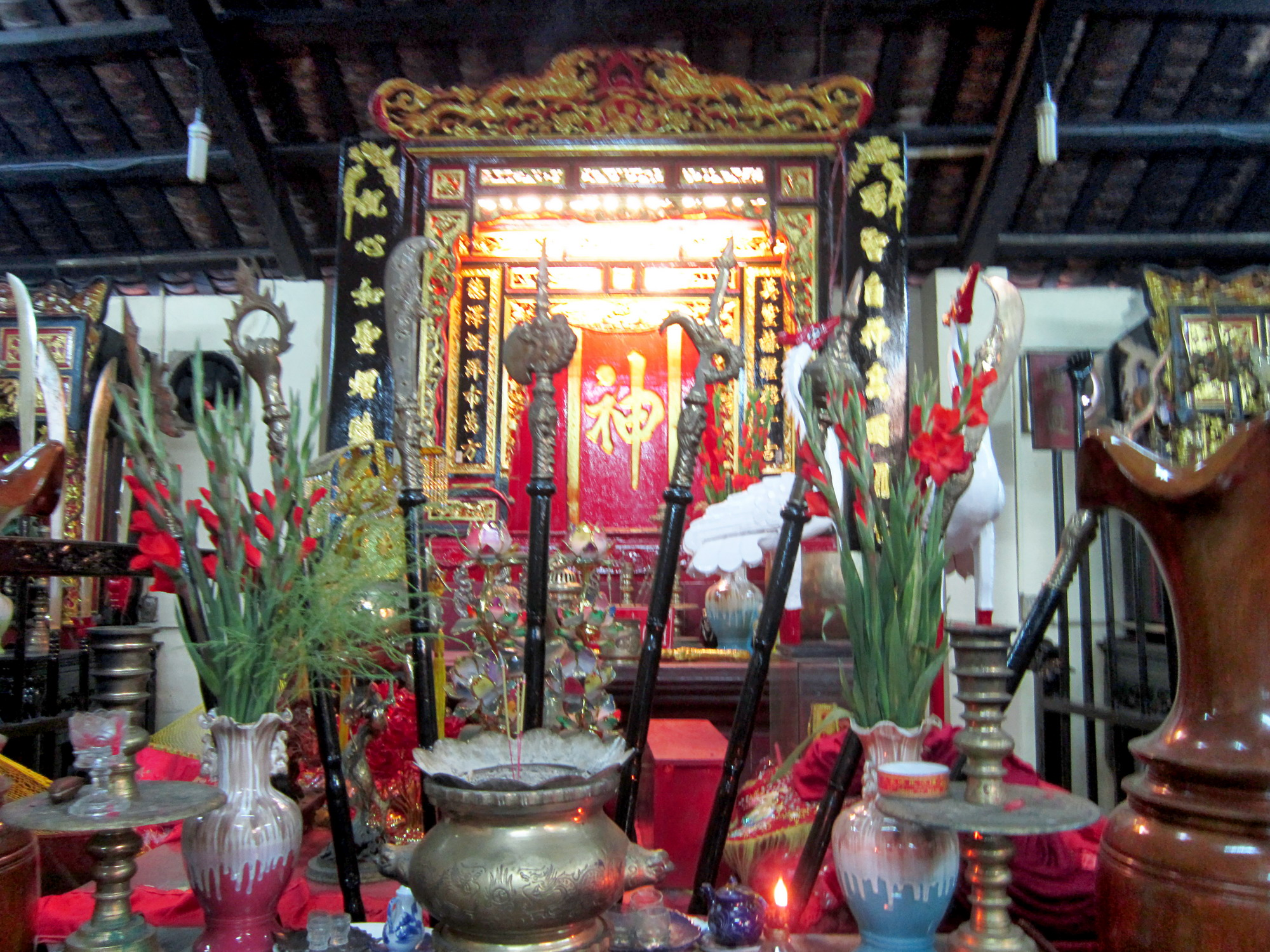
The altar of Thành hoàng in Đình Chí Hòa

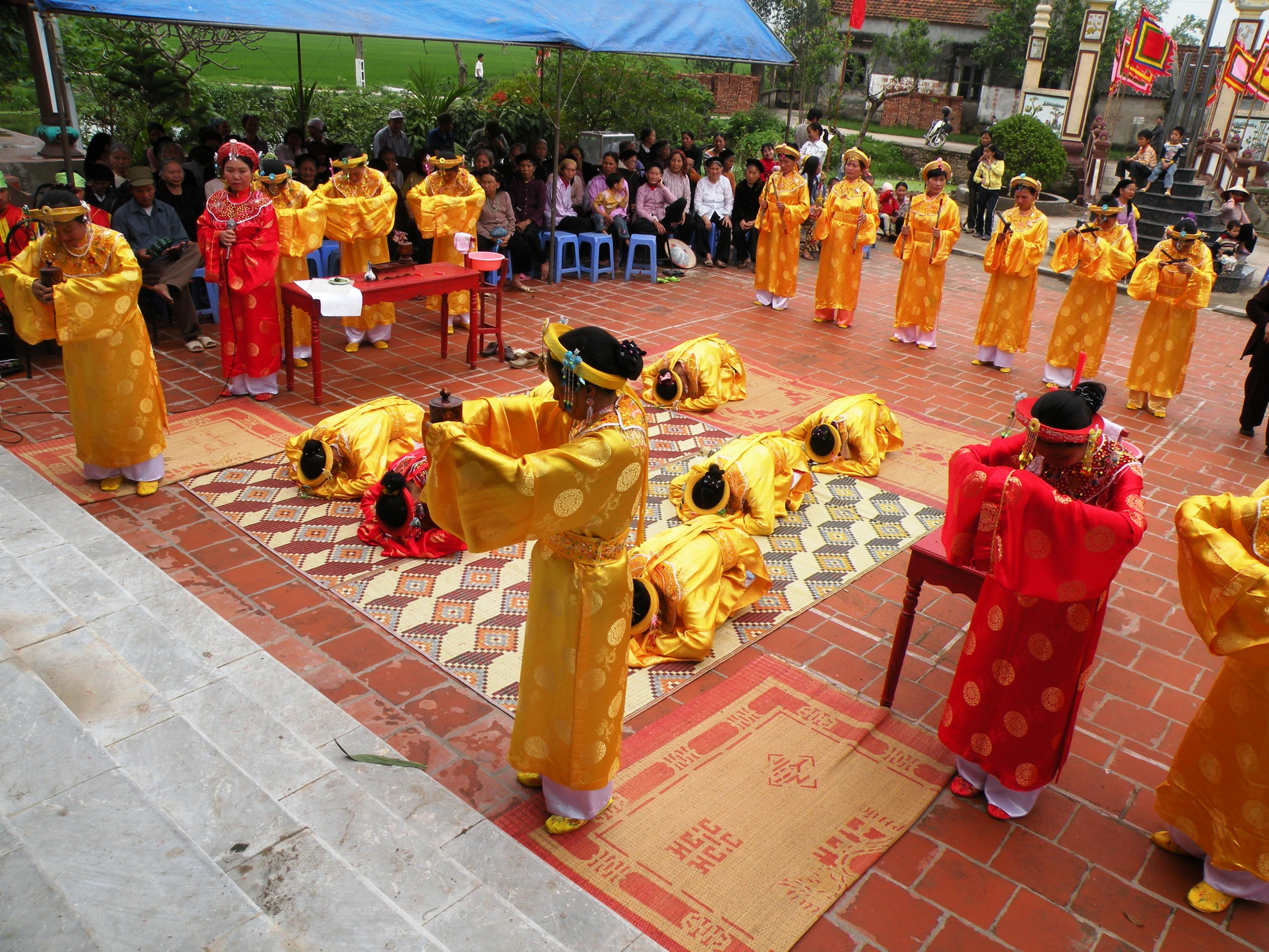
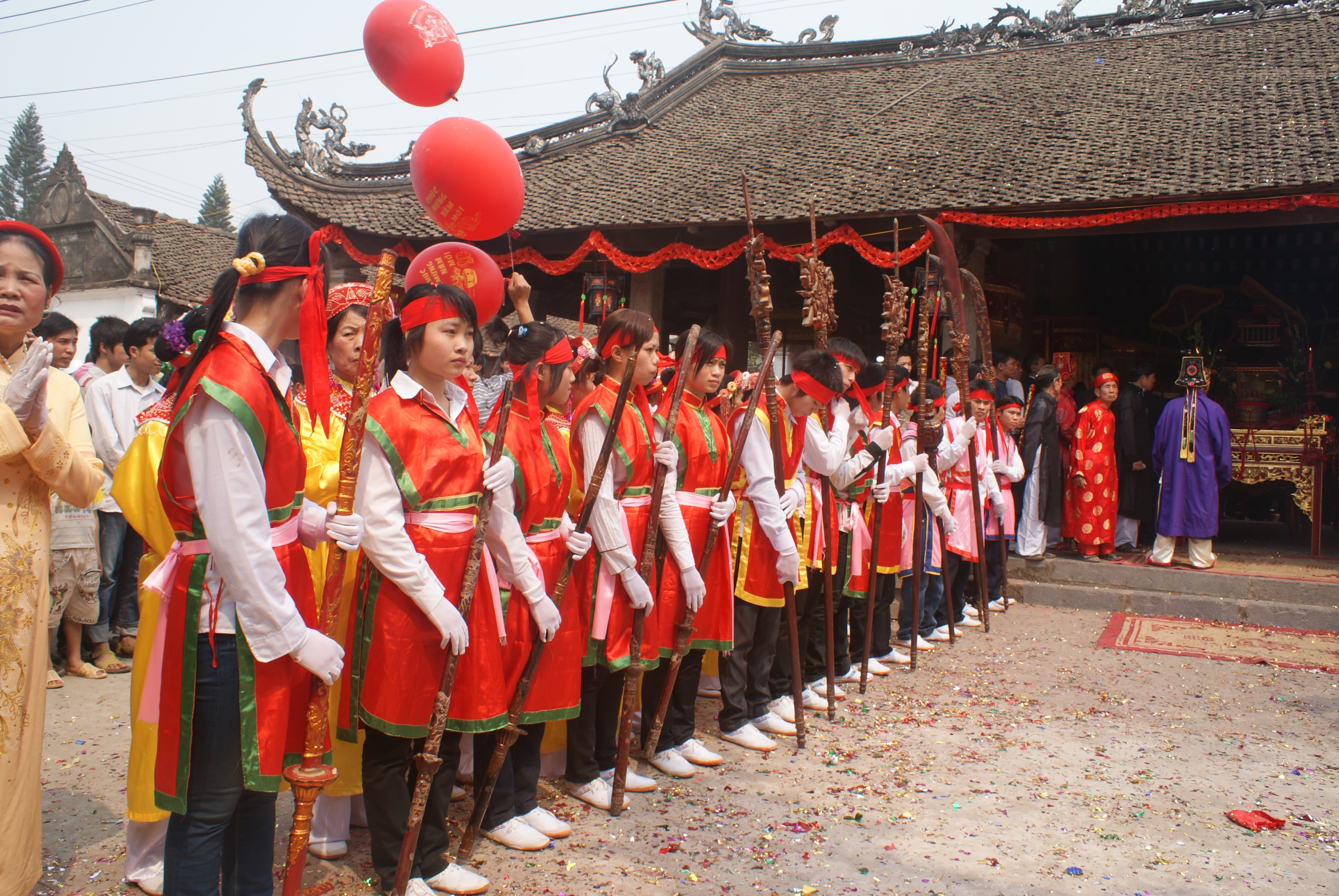
People are holding a ceremony to worship the Thành hoàng

Generally each village worships only one Thành Hoàng; however, it is not rare to see two or more gods enshrined simultaneously at a village. They are known collectively as Gods of Fortune (Phúc Thần).

Even these Gods were divided in three ranks

- High ranking gods: famous mountain and river gods, immortals such as Thánh Gióng, Chử Đồng Tử whose backgrounds are mysterious and miraculous, and unusually brilliant men such as Lý Thường Kiệt and Trần Hưng Đạo.
- Middle ranking gods: whose accomplishments are ambiguous but have been worshiped for a long time
- Lower ranking gods: whose background and accomplishments are ambiguous but are known to bless mortals

Apart from the ranked gods acknowledged by the government, there were villages that worshiped "demons" and "tainted gods" such as the Beggar God, the Serpent God, the God of Lecherousness, and others.

== Gallery ==
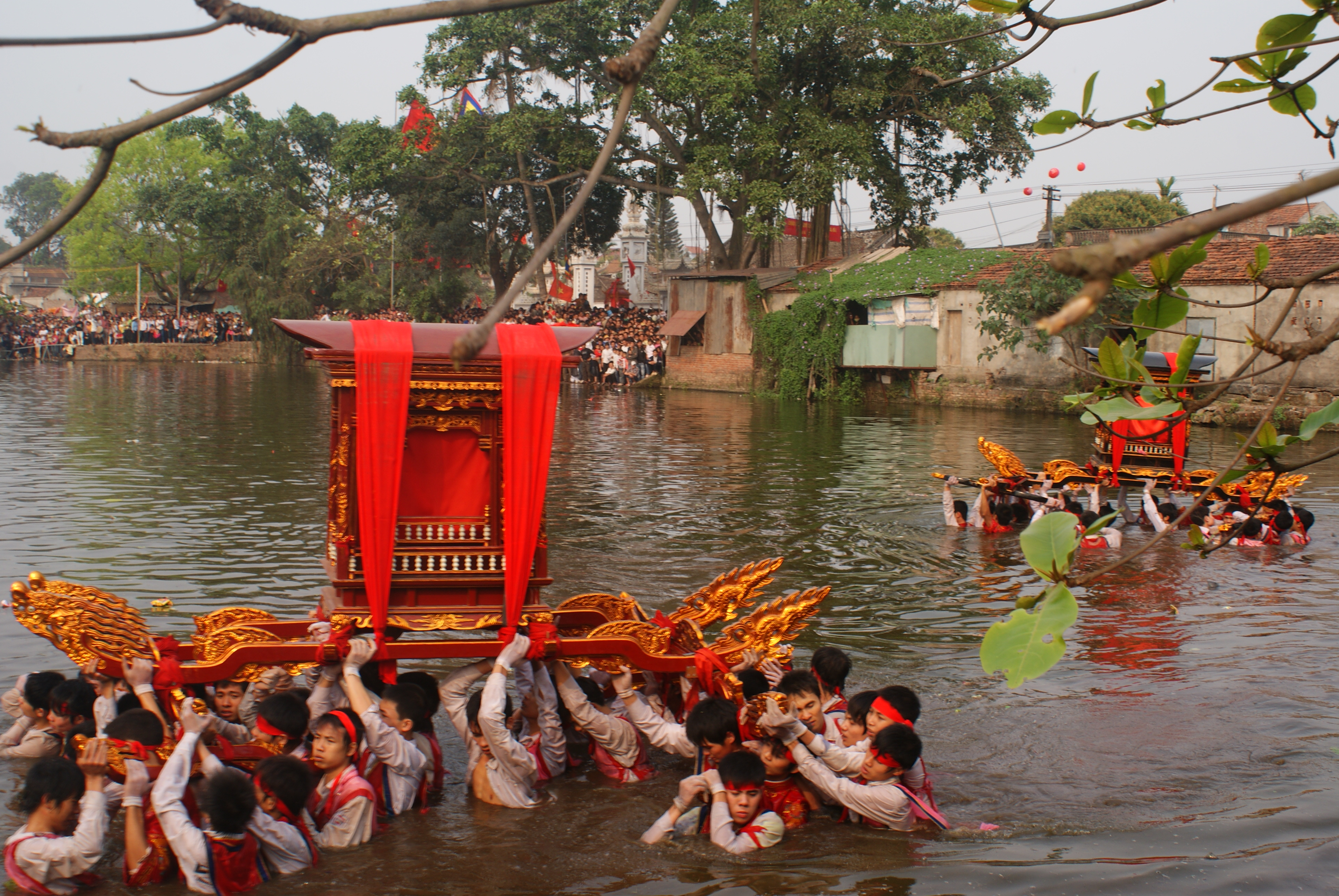
Ceremonial procession of Thành hoàng in Vân Côn village.

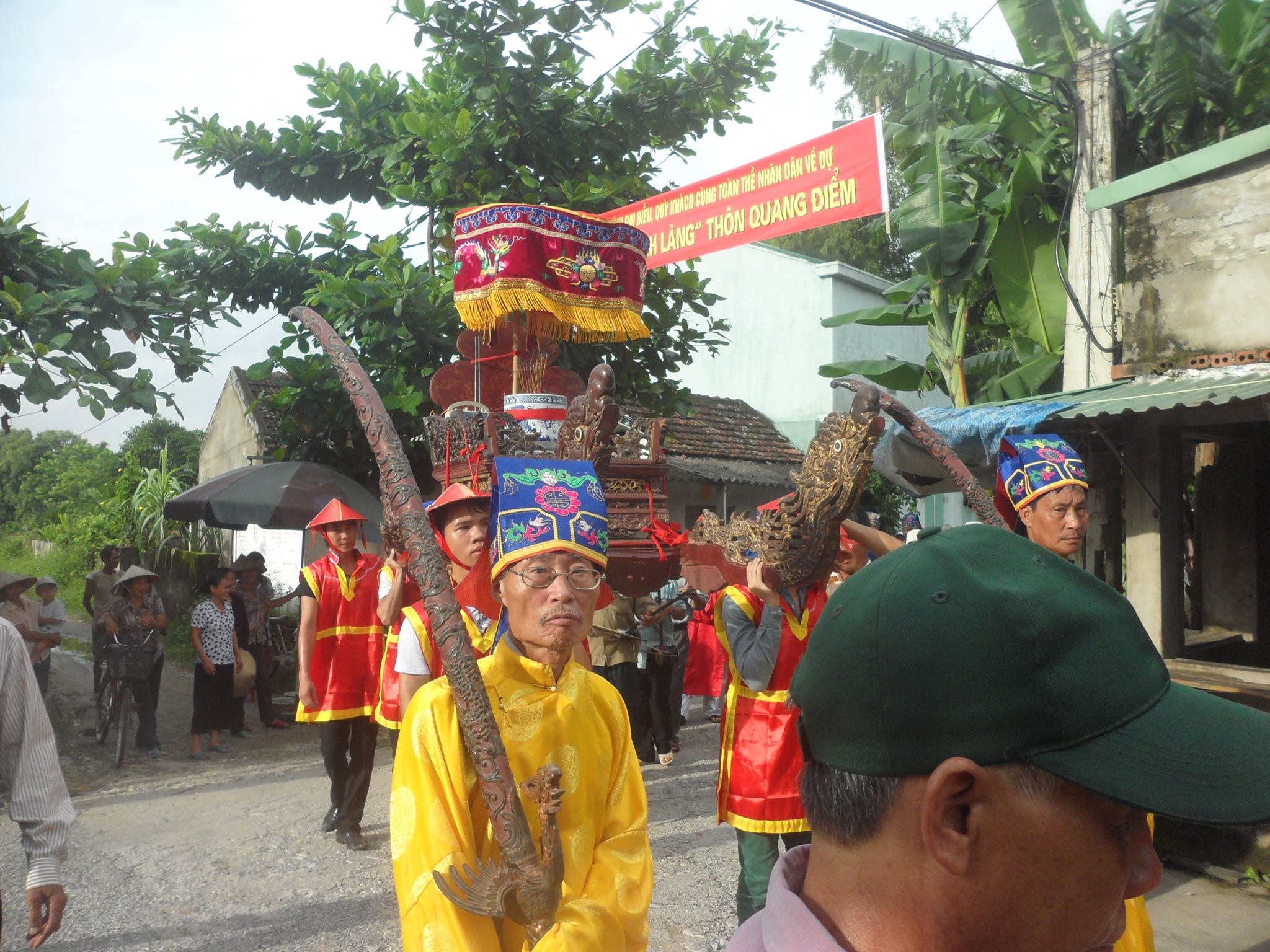
Ceremonial procession of Thành hoàng in Quang Điểm village.

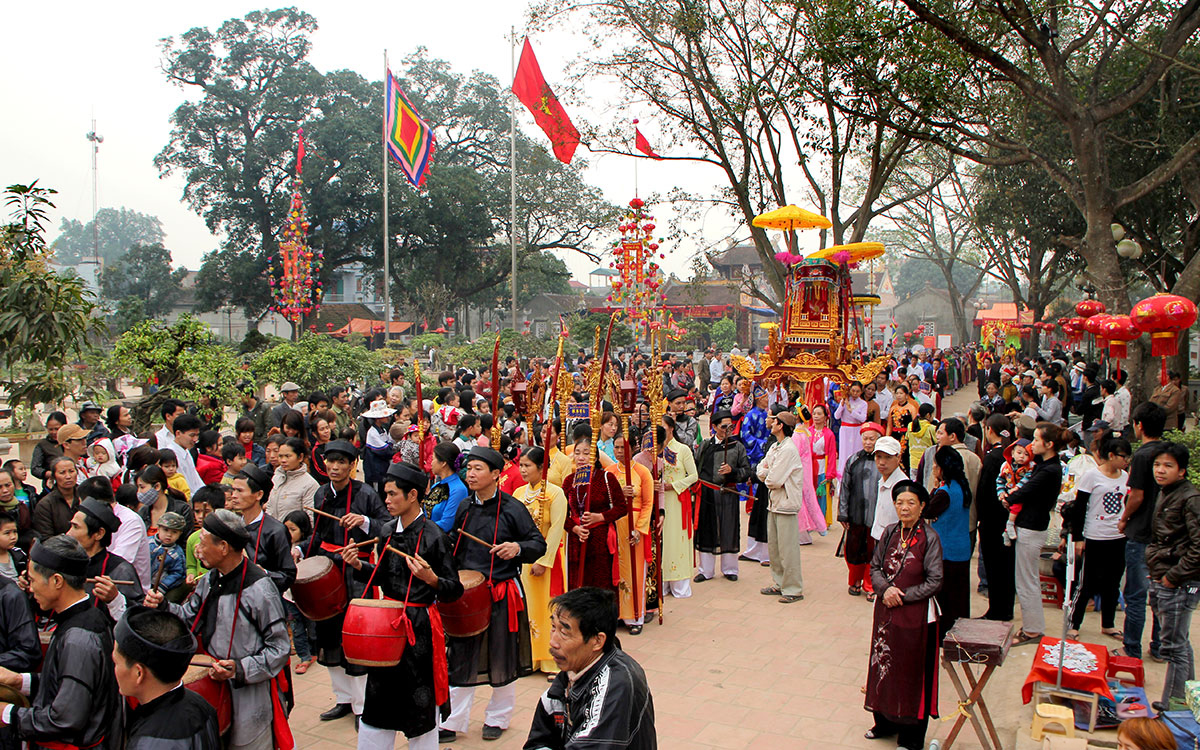
Ceremonial procession of Thành hoàng in Bình Đà village.

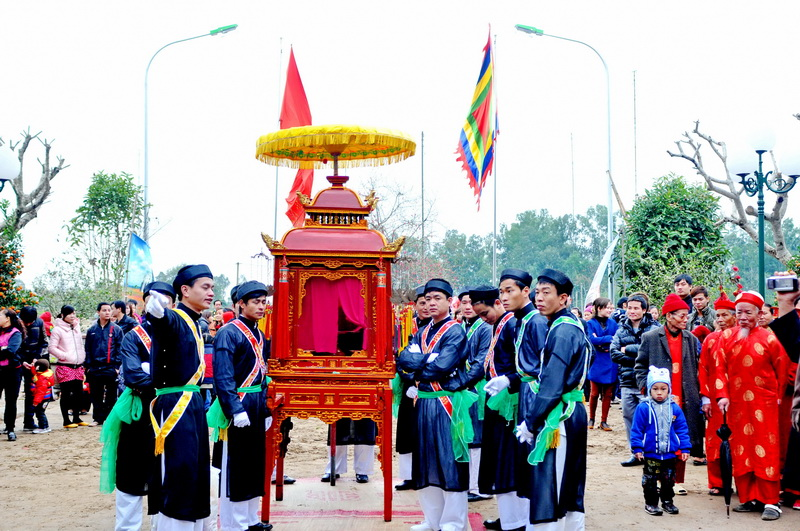
Ceremonial procession of Thành hoàng in Triều Khúc village.

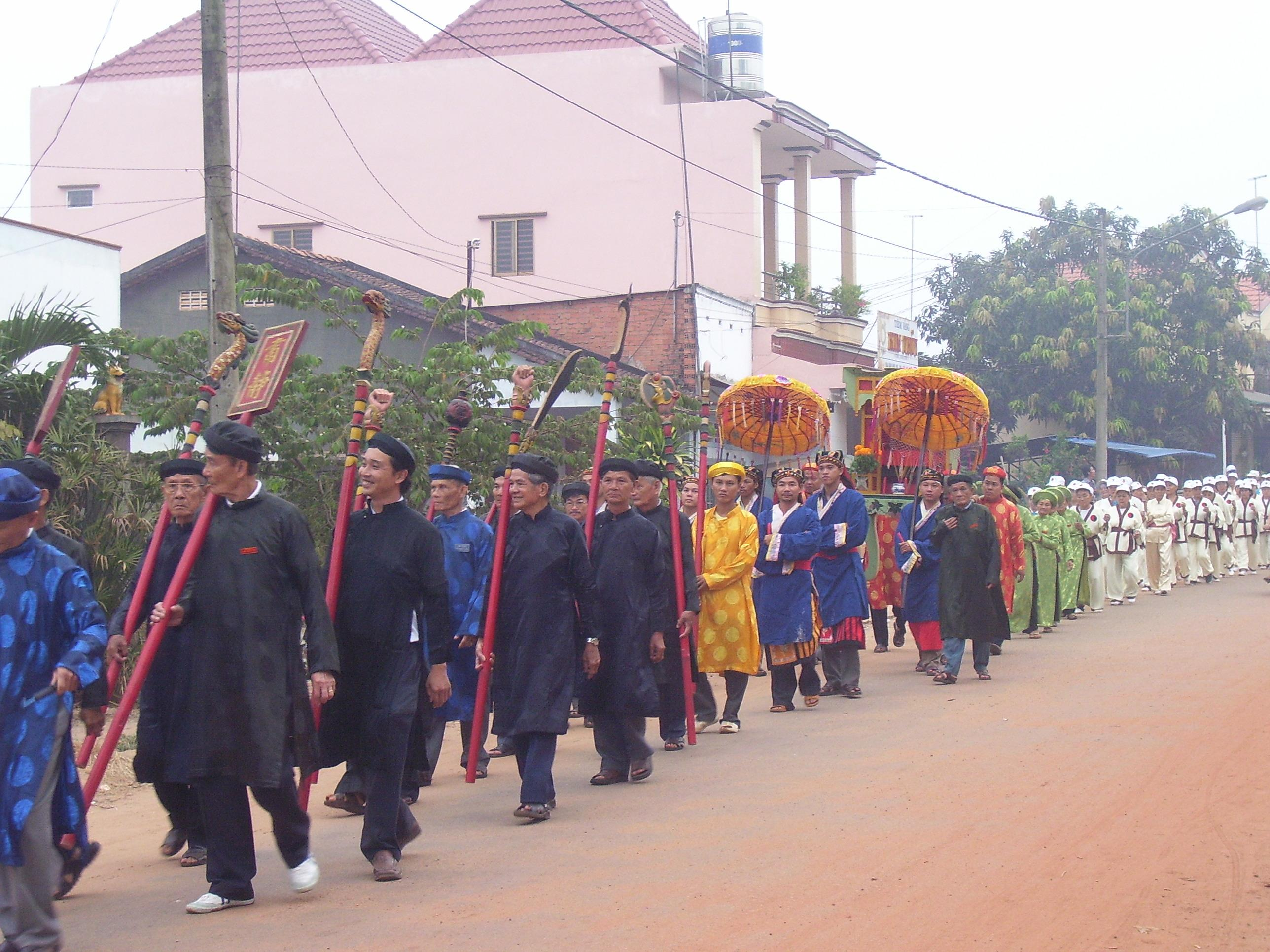
Ceremonial procession of Thành hoàng Nguyễn Văn Thành in Tân An commune, Thủ Dầu Một, Bình Dương province.

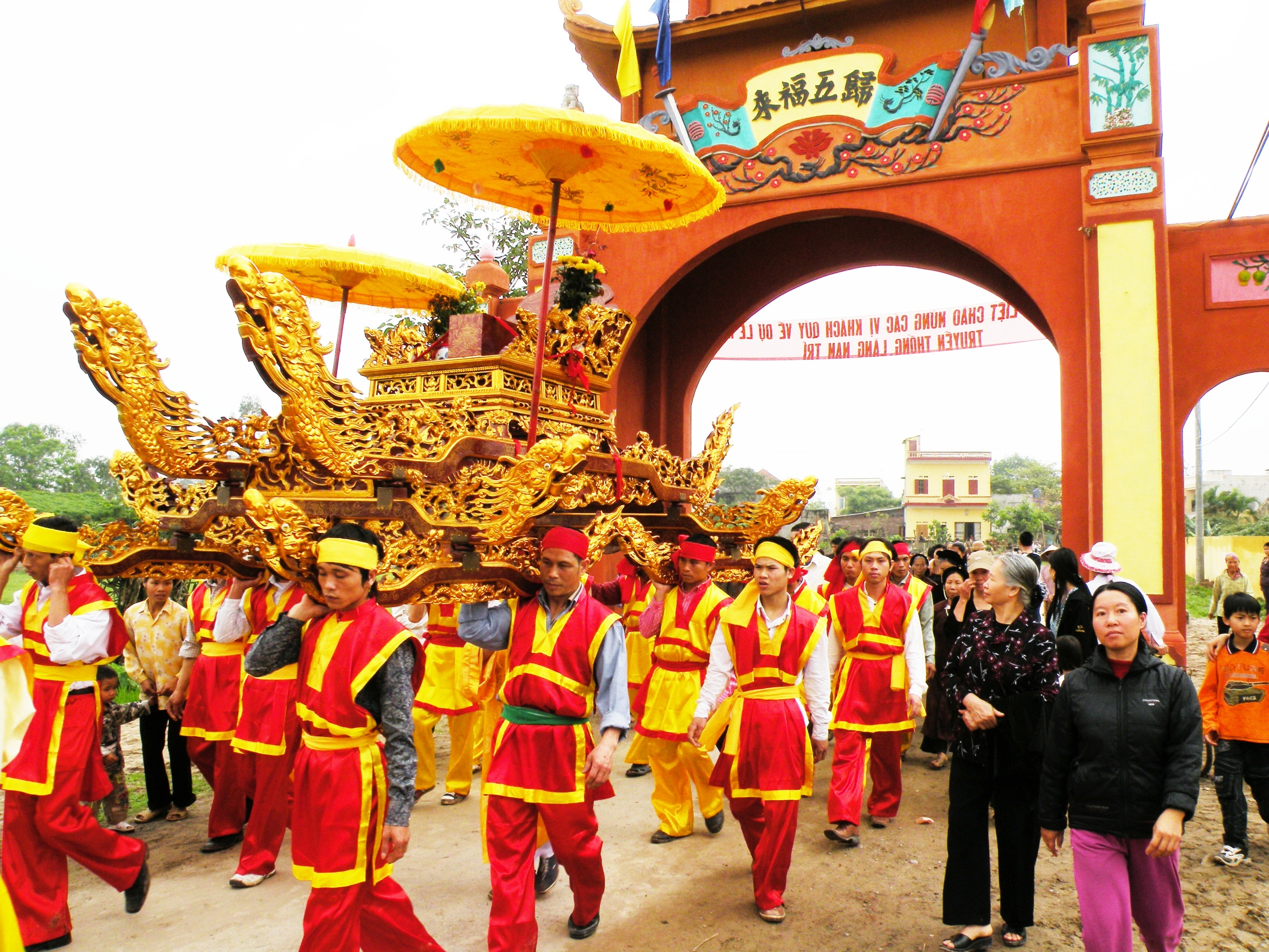
Ceremonial procession of Thành hoàng in Nam Trì village.

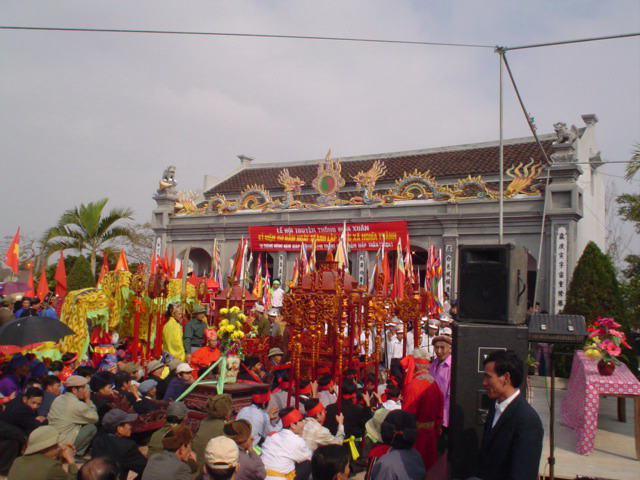
Ceremonial procession of Thành hoàng in Nghĩa Thành village.

== See also ==
- Cheng Huang Gong
- Tu Di Gong
- Seonangsin
- Dōsojin
