= Korean shamanism =

Korean religion

The samtaegeuk (삼태극; 三太極) symbol—representing humanity (yellow), heaven (blue), and earth (red)—is often displayed on the exterior of gutdang (굿당; 굿堂), or Musok shrines

Korean shamanism, also known as Musok (무속; 巫俗) or Muism (Korean: 무교; Hanja: 巫敎; RR: Mugyo), is a religion from Korea. Scholars of religion classify it as a folk religion and sometimes regard it as one facet of a broader Korean vernacular religion distinct from Buddhism, Daoism, and Confucianism. There is no central authority in control of Musok, with much diversity of belief and practice evident among practitioners.

A polytheistic religion, Musok revolves around gods and ancestral spirits. Central to the tradition are ritual specialists, the majority of them female, called mudang (무당; 巫堂). In English they have sometimes been called "shamans", although the accuracy of this term is debated among anthropologists. The mudang serve as mediators between humans and the supernatural world. They also perform gut rituals, during which they offer food and drink to the gods and spirits or entertain them with storytelling, song, and dance. Gut may take place in a private home or in a guttang shrine, often located on a mountain. The mudang divide into regional sub-types, the largest being the mansin or kangsin-mu, historically dominant in Korea's northern regions, whose rituals involve them being personally possessed by deities or ancestral spirits. Another type is the sesŭp-mu of eastern and southern regions, whose rituals entail spirit mediumship but not possession.

The origins of Musok are unclear but the earliest historical references to mudang date to the 12th century. During the Joseon period, Confucian elites suppressed the mudang with taxation and legal restrictions, deeming their rites to be improper. From the late 19th century, modernisers – many of them Christian – characterised Musok as misin (superstition) and supported its suppression. During the Japanese occupation of the early 20th century, nationalistically oriented folklorists began promoting the idea that Musok represented Korea's ancient religion and a manifestation of its national culture; an idea later heavily promoted by mudang themselves. In the mid-20th century, persecution of mudang continued in North Korea and through the New Community Movement in South Korea. More positive appraisal of the mudang occurred in South Korea from the late 1970s onward, especially as practitioners were associated with the minjung pro-democracy movement and came to be regarded as a source of Korean cultural identity.

Musok is primarily found in South Korea, where there are over 200,000 mudang, although practitioners are also found abroad. While Korean attitudes to religion have historically been fairly inclusive, allowing for syncretism between Musok and Buddhism, the mudang have nevertheless long been marginalised. Disapproval of mudang, often regarded as charlatans, remains widespread in South Korea, especially among Christians.

== Definition ==
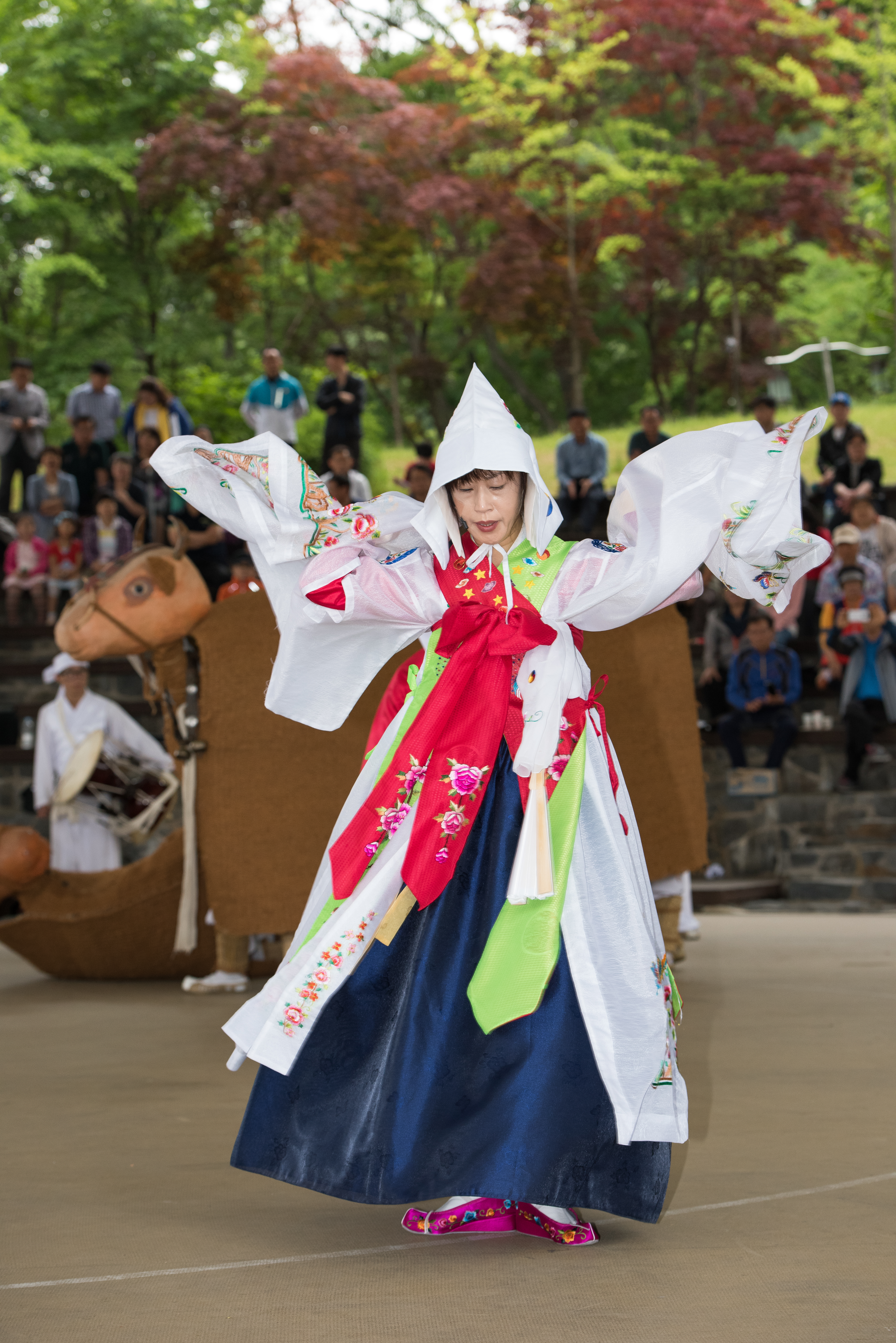
A mudang performing a gut ritual in Yangju, South Korea

The anthropologist Chongho Kim noted that defining Korean shamanism was "really problematic". He characterised "Korean shamanism" as a largely "residual" category into which all Korean religious practices that were not Buddhist, Confucian, or Christian were placed. Scholars like Griffin Dix, Kil-sŏng Ch'oe and Don Baker have conversely presented Korean shamanism as just one facet of "Korean folk religion", the latter sometimes called minsok chonggyo in Korean.

Korean shamanism has varyingly been labelled a vernacular religion, a folk religion, a popular religion, and an indigenous religion. It is a non-institutionalized tradition, rather than being an organized religion akin to Buddhism or Christianity. It has no doctrine, nor any overarching hierarchy, and is orally transmitted. It displays considerable regional variation, as well as variation according to the choices of individual practitioners. Over time, the tradition has displayed both continuity and change.

One term commonly used for this tradition is musok ("mu folklore"), coined by the folklorist Yi Nŭnghwa. Although developed during the Japanese colonial period, when it was employed with derogatory connotations, the term has since become popular with the Korean population and with scholars; the Korean studies scholar Antonetta L. Bruno for instance capitalised it as Musok to serve as a name for the religion. Alternative terms include mugyo, muijŭm, and mu, while the scholar Suk-Jay Yim proposed "Muism" as a name. In Korea, the term misin ("superstition") is sometimes used for this religion, but is also applied to other religious and cultural practices like pungsu geomancy. While misin carries negative connotations in Korean culture, some mudang use it to describe what they do.

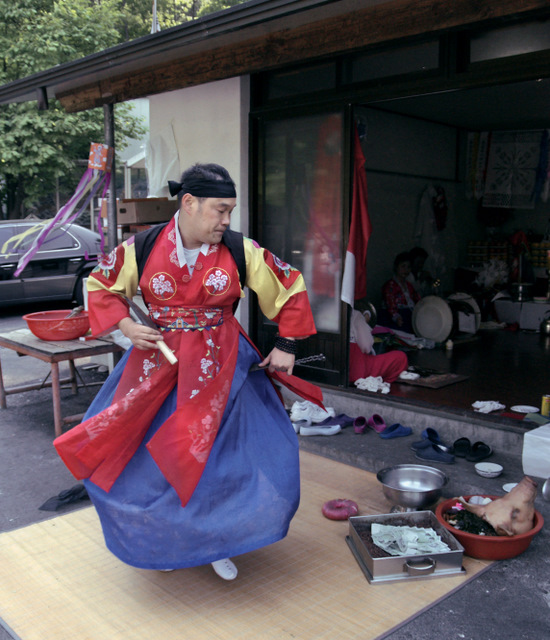
A paksu, or male mudang, performing a ritual in South Korea

Since the late 19th century, English language studies have referred to the mudang as "shamans" and their practices as "Korean shamanism", a label rendered into Korean as shyamŏnijŭm. Introduced to English from the Tungusic languages at the end of the 17th century, the term "shamanism" has never received a commonly agreed definition and has been used in at least four distinct ways. A common definition uses "shamanism" to describe traditions involving visionary flights to perform rituals in a spirit realm, a practice not found in Korean traditional religion. Many scholars avoid the term "shaman" as a cross-cultural category altogether. Its application to Korean religion is controversial, with Chongho Kim deeming it "often unhelpful", and Korean studies scholar Richard McBride labelling it "a legacy of the colonial period". Dix thought "spirit mediumship" a more suitable description than "shamanism".

Prior to Christianity's arrival in the 17th and 18th centuries, Korean religion was rarely exclusivist, with many Koreans practising Daoism, Buddhism, Confucianism, and Musok simultaneously. Despite shared underlying beliefs, these traditions undertook what Dix called a "division of ritual and cosmological responsibility" between each other. Confucian rituals were for example primarily concerned with ancestor veneration and tended to be simpler and more regular, whereas the mudang were consulted for rarer and more complex ritual tasks. Korea has seen particular syncretism between Musok and Buddhism; mudang often identify as Buddhists, may use incantations from Buddhist sutras, and commonly worship Buddhist deities. Some Korean Buddhist temples, similarly, venerate deities traditionally associated with Musok. In contemporary South Korea, it remains possible for followers of most religions (barring Christianity) to involve themselves in Musok with little censure from their fellow religionists. Meanwhile, mudang based in Europe have merged the tradition with New Age elements.

=== Terms and types of practitioners ===
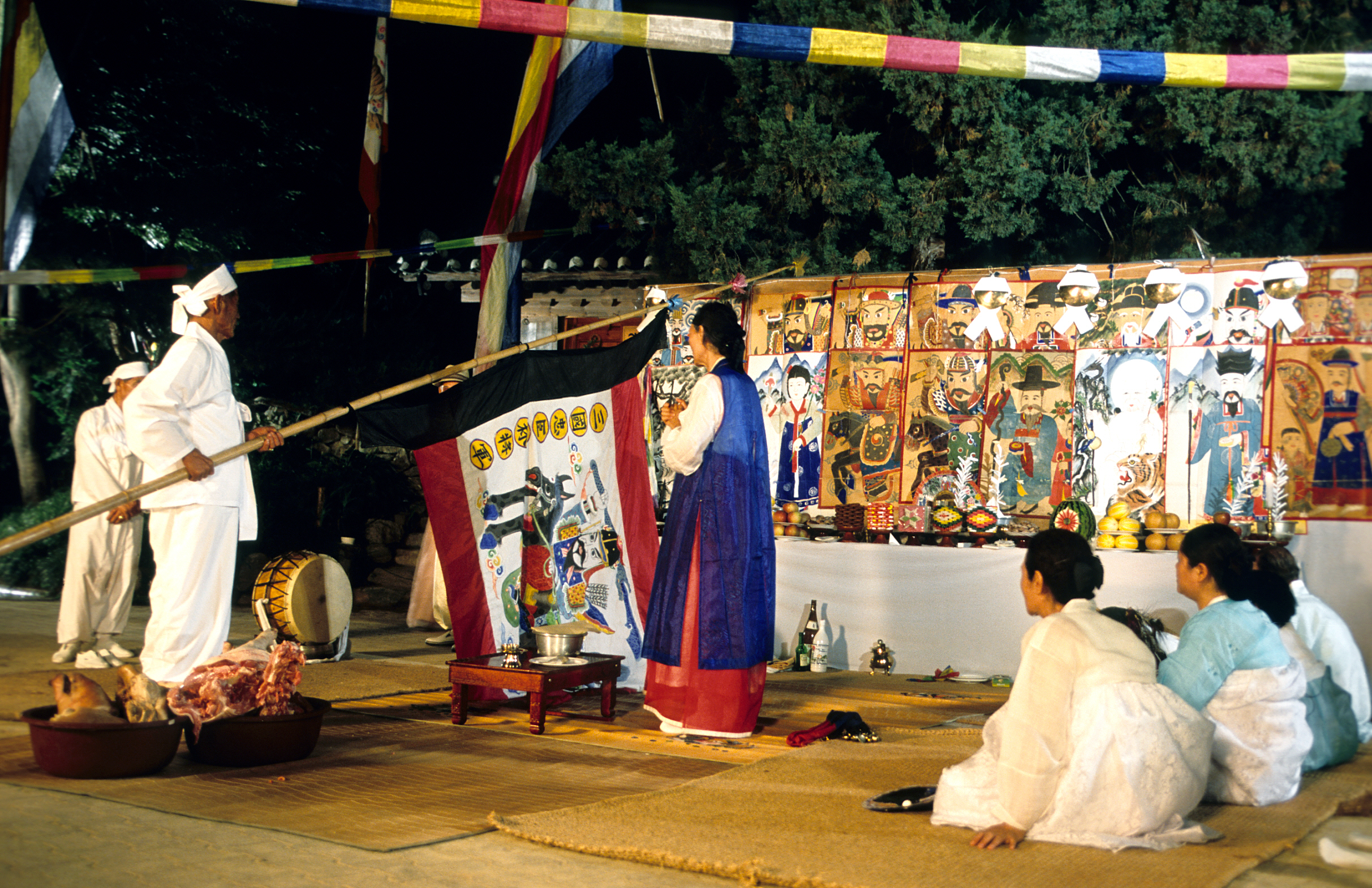
A Korean gut ritual performed in 2002

Central to Musok are those whom the anthropologist Kyoim Yun called "ritual specialists who mediate between their clients and the invisible" (forces of the supernatural). The most common Korean term for these specialists is mudang. Although regularly used, the term mudang carries derogatory connotations in Korean culture, and thus some practitioners avoid it.

An alternative term for these individuals is mu, the latter synonymous with the Chinese word wu, also used for ritual specialists. Several modern mudang advocacy groups have adopted the term musogin, meaning "people who do mu". While the term mudang can apply to a man or woman, specific terms for male Musok specialists include paksu, or, more commonly used in the past, kyŏksa. Modern advocacy groups have also described Musok's supporters as sindo (believers) or musindo (believers in the ways of mu).

==== Subtypes ====
Mudang are often divided into two broad types: the kangsin-mu, or "god-descended" mu, and the sesŭp-mu or "hereditary" mu. The former engage in rituals in which they describe being possessed by supernatural entities; the latter's rituals involve interaction with these entities but not possession. The former was historically more common in northern and central parts of the Korean peninsula, the latter in southern parts below the Han River. The kangsin-mu tradition later spread and by the late 20th century was dominant across South Korea, with its ritual costumes and paraphernalia being widely adopted.

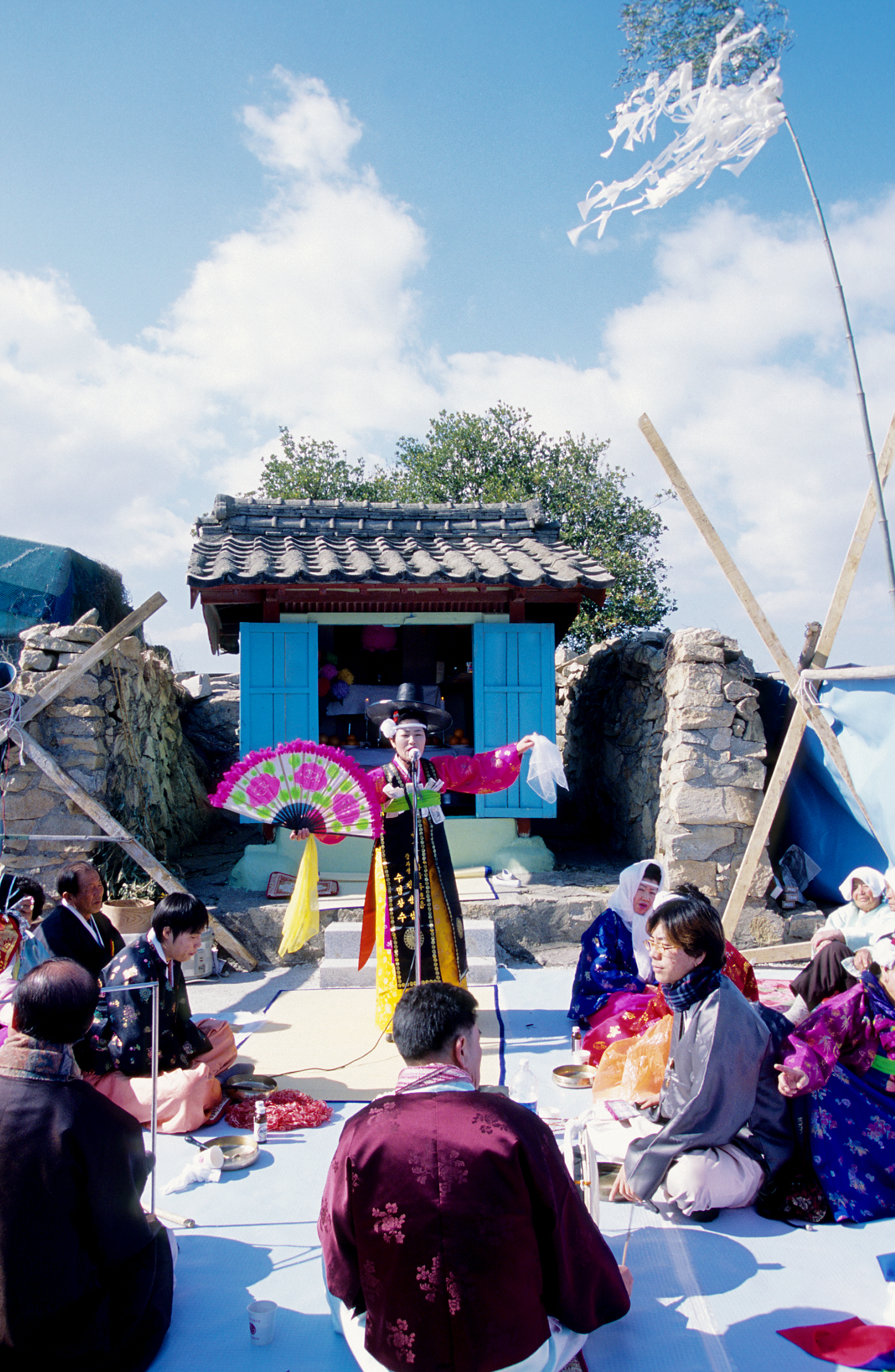
A Donghaean Byeolsingut (Village Gut of the East Coast) performed in 2002

Lines between the sesŭp-mu and kangsin-mu are nevertheless blurred. Although the sesŭp-mu are typically presented as inheriting the role in a hereditary fashion, not all sesŭp-mu do so, while some kangsin-mu continue the role of a family member as if maintaining a hereditary tradition. Yun commented that dividing the mudang into distinct typologies "cannot explain complex reality".

Certain regional terms are also used for the mudang. The sesŭp-mu are often called tanggol in Jeolla Province, and simbang on Jeju Island. The latter term was first recorded in the 15th century, used for mudang on the Korean mainland, but by the early 19th century was exclusively used for practitioners on Jeju. An alternative term for the kangsin-mu is mansin, a term meaning "ten thousand spirits/gods", and which has less derogatory connotations than the label mudang.

Other terms sometimes used for mudang may elsewhere be restricted to different types of Korean ritual specialist. The term yeongmae, describing a spirit medium, is sometimes used synonymously with mudang but at other times describes a distinct group of practitioners. Another term some mudang adopt for themselves is posal (bosal), originally a Korean term for a Buddhist bodhisattva, and which is favored more by female than male practitioners. Conversely, some mudang maintain that the term posal should be reserved for diviners who are possessed by child spirits but who do not perform the gut rituals that are central to mudang practice.

== Beliefs ==
=== Theology ===
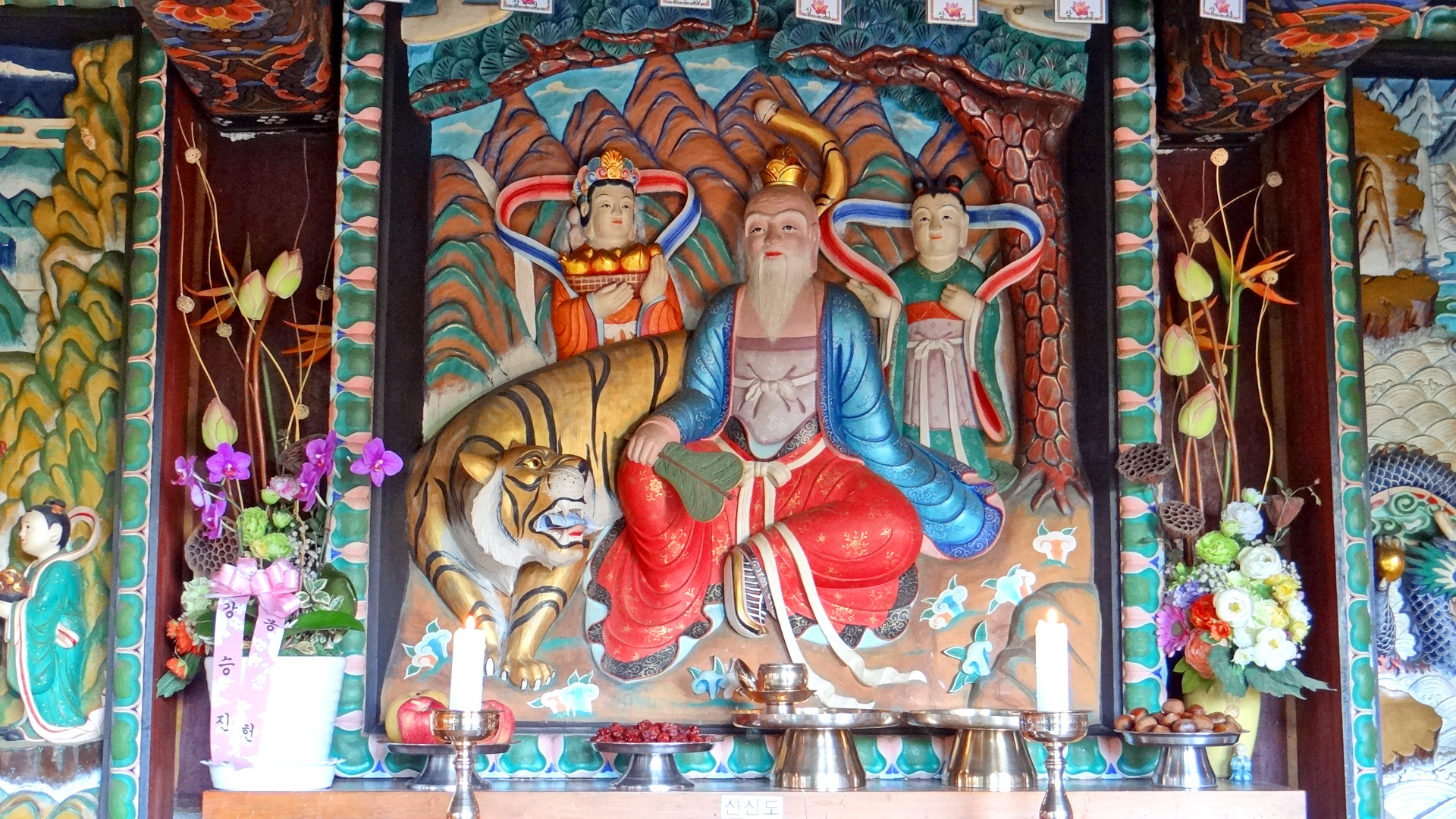
An altar in a Sansingak ("mountain god shrine"). Sansingak are often controlled by Buddhist temples. This one belongs to the Jeongsu Temple of Ganghwa Island.

Musok is polytheistic. Supernatural beings are called gwisin, or sin. The mudang divide these beings into two main groups: the gods and the ancestral spirits. The gwisin are deemed volatile; if humans do well by them, they can receive good fortune, but offending these entities can bring suffering. Devotees of these entities believe that they can engage, converse, and bargain with them. These deities bestow myŏnggi ('divine energy') upon the mudang, enabling the latter to have visions and intuition that allows them to perform their ritual tasks.

Each mudang has their own personal pantheon of gwisin, which may differ from the pantheon of the mudang they trained under. This individual pantheon is the chusin. A mudang may add new deities to it during their career. Certain supernatural beings will be considered guardian deities, each referred to as a taesin. A mudang will also claim a personal spiritual guardian, known as the momju (plural momjusin). The momjusin of male mudang are usually female; those of female mudang are typically male.

==== Deities ====
In Korean traditional religion, the deities are called janggunsin, and typically take human form. The pantheon of deities, which has changed over time, is termed sindang, with over 130 Musok divinities having been identified. The deities can be divided into those embodying natural or cosmological forces and those who were once human, including monarchs, officials, and generals. Some derive from Daoist or Buddhist traditions and others are unique to Korean vernacular religion. They are deemed capable of manifesting in material forms, as in paintings or statues, or as inhabiting landscape locations such as trees, rocks, springs, and stone piles. The anthropologist Laurel Kendall suggested that the relationship that mudang had with these spirit-inhabited sites was akin to animism.

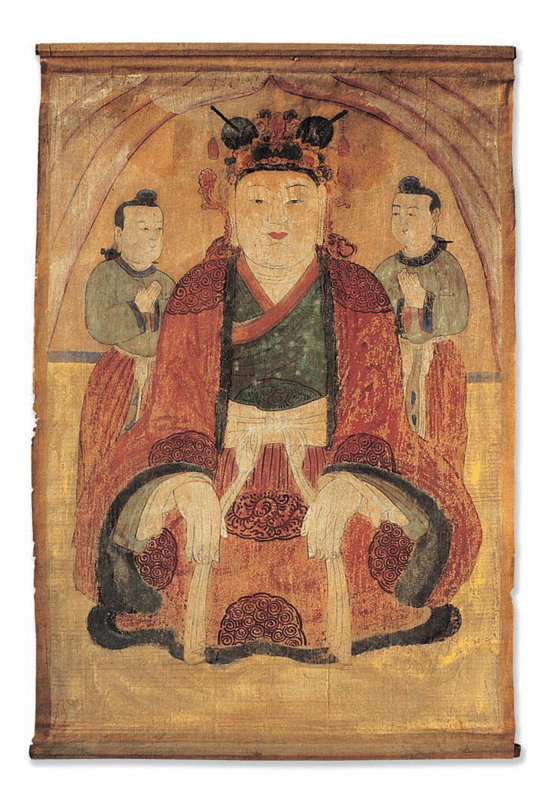
Late Joseon period depiction of Hogu Pyŏlsŏng, goddess of smallpox

The highest deities are often deemed remote and little interested in human affairs. The governing god in Korean tradition, referred to as Hananim, Hanallim, or Hanŭnim, is deemed to rule the heavens but is rarely worshipped. Some of the more powerful deities can make demands from humans without any obligation to reciprocate. Other deities are involved in everyday human concerns and prayed to accordingly. Many of the deities desire food and drink, spend money, and enjoy song and dance, and thus receive these things as offerings. Spirits of the dead are thought to yearn for the activities and pleasures they enjoyed in life; spirits of military generals are for instance believed to like dangerous games. The associations of particular deities can change over time; Hogu Pyŏlsŏng was a goddess of smallpox, but after that disease's eradication in the 20th century retained associations with measles and chickenpox.

Popular cosmological deities include Chilseongsin, the spirit of the seven stars of the Big Dipper, who is regarded as a merciful Buddhist figure that cares for children. Yŏngdŏng is a goddess of the wind, popular in southern areas including Jeju. The mountain god, or mountain gods more broadly, are called sansin, or sometimes sansillyŏng, and are usually seen as the most important spirits of the earth. Sansin is typically depicted as a man with a white beard, blue gown, and accompanying tiger. Water deities, or yong, are dragons deemed to live in rivers, springs, and the sea. The most senior dragon is the Yong-Wang (Dragon King) who rules the oceans.

Spirits of military generals are sinjang, and include the obang changgun, the generals of the five cardinal points. Among the sinjang are historical figures like Ch'oeyŏng, Im Kyŏngŏp, Oh, and Chang, as well as more recent military figures; around Inchon, various mudang have venerated General Douglas MacArthur as a hero of the Korean War. Child deities are dongja. The Korean traditional cosmology also includes mischievous spirits called dokkaebi, and entities called tongt'o that can lodge in the family compound and cause trouble.

==== Village, household, and ancestral spirits ====
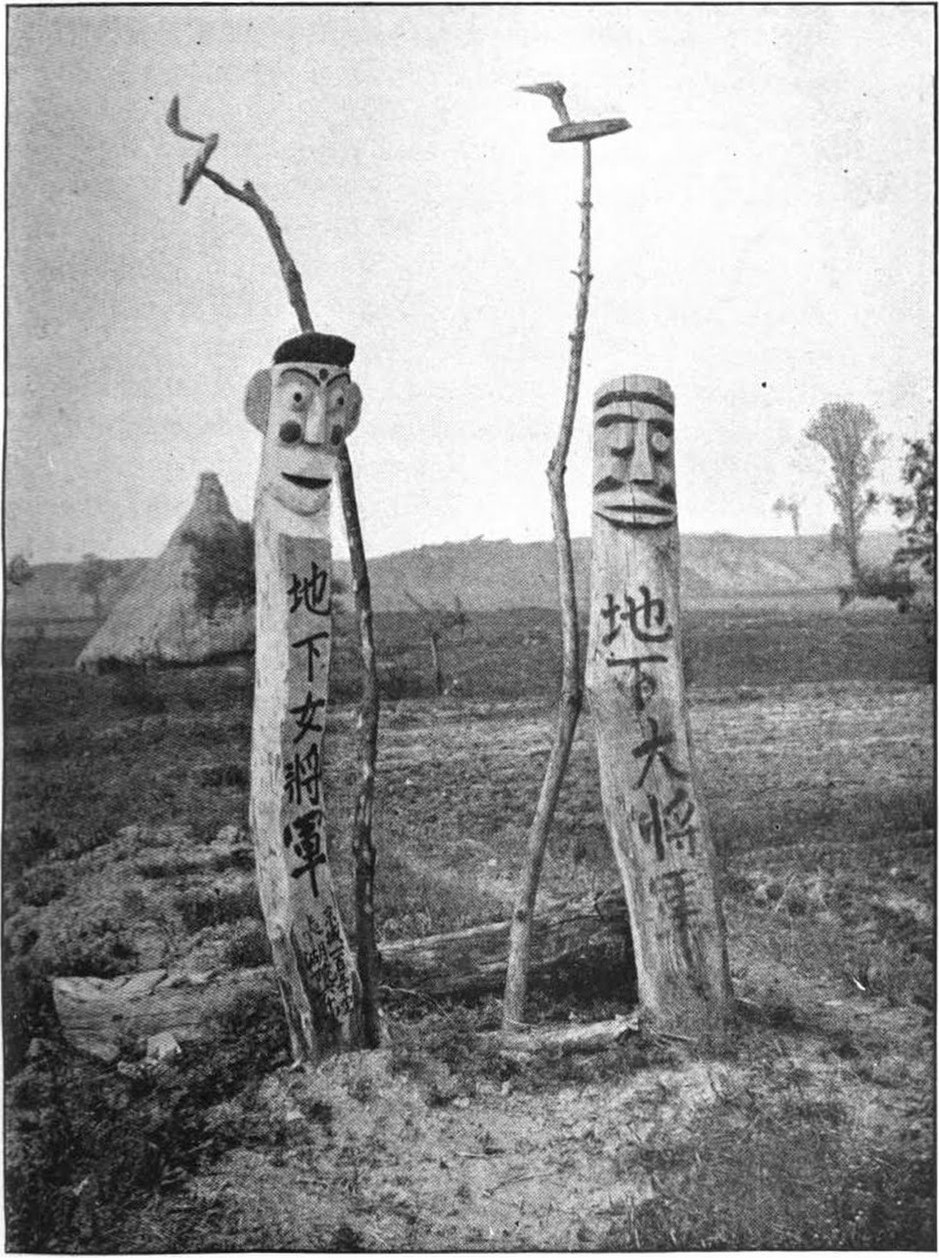
Two jangseung outside a Korean village, photographed in 1903

Korean villages traditionally had Jangseung, timber or occasionally stone posts representing two generals who would guard the settlement from harmful spirits. On Jeju, these were constructed of volcanic rock and were respectively called the Harubang ('grandfather') and Halmang ('grandmother'). Historically, villages often held annual festivals to thank their tutelary deities. These were often overseen by local men and reflected Confucian traditions, although sometimes mudang did participate. The rapid urbanisation of Korean society has radically changed how people interact with their local deities.

Korean vernacular religion includes household deities, the chief of which is Sŏngju, the principal house guardian. Others include T'oju taegum, who patrols the precincts of the household, Chowang the kitchen spirit, and Pyŏnso Kakssi, the protector of the toilet. Keeping these entities happy was traditionally regarded as the role of the housewife, and is achieved through offering them food and drink. These informal rituals do not require the involvement of mudang, who would only be called in for special occasions. Pollution caused by births or deaths in the household are believed to result in Sŏngju leaving, meaning that he must be encouraged to return through ritual. Sŏngju may also require propitiation if expensive goods are brought into the home, as he expects a portion of the expenditure to be devoted to him.

Ancestral spirits are called chosang. Tutelary ancestors are termed tangju. Ancestors who may be venerated in Musok rituals are broader than the purely patrilineal figures venerated in formal Korean ancestor veneration rites, the Jesa. These broader ancestors may for instance include those from a woman's natal family, women who have married out of the family, or family members who have died without offspring. While both the Musok rites and the Confucian jesa entail communication with ancestors, only the former involves direct communication with these spirits, allowing the ancestors to convey messages straight to the living. Certain ancestral spirits can also form part of a mudang's personal pantheon.

=== Cosmology and mythology ===
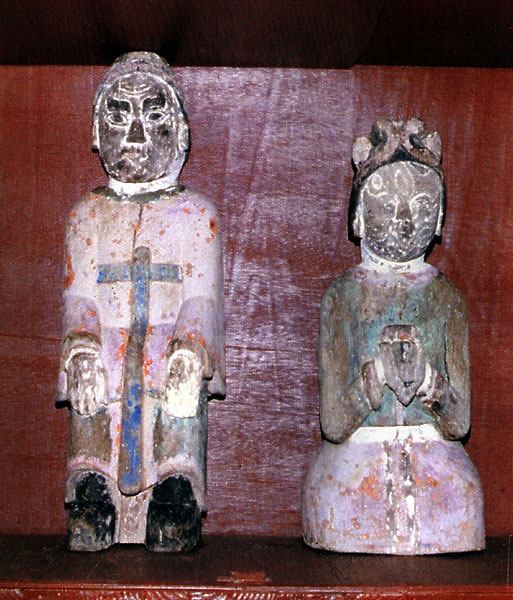
Statues of Gongsim (right) and her beloved Jo Tong (left) at Okgwa, Gokseong County. Gongsim is central to a story about Musok's origins.

A general cosmology informs various forms of Korean religion, including Musok. Origin myths are often called ponp'uri, and have been extensively collected and studied by Korean scholars. There are various myths and legends pertaining to the origins of the mudang. Certain traits recur in these narratives, including the association of Musok with royalty and the importance of mountains. According to one tale, for instance recorded in the Muyŭ-Sockgo, the first mudang were the eight daughters of a man named Bupŭ-Whasang; these daughters then departed in different directions, spreading the tradition throughout Korea. The notion of eight initial mudang likely refers to Korea's eight traditional provinces.

Several other narratives attribute Musok's origins to an ancient princess. A story from Gyeonggi Province holds that the founder of Musok was Ǎwhang-Kongchu, or the princess of Yaŏ in China. She prayed for the good of her people and in turn they began to venerate her, with these followers becoming the first mudang. This princess is also presented as the founding patron of Musok in a story from Chungcheong Province, but here she is instead presented as being part of the Korean Koryŭ kingdom. From the Seoul area, a tale is reported maintaining that the princess from which Musok descended was named Pari-Kongchu (Princess Pari). In a story popular in Gyeongsang Province, the central princess is Gongsim and she experienced the sickness that would be a common trait of later mudang. The king cast her out because of this, and she went to Mount Kumgang in Kangwon Province. She had twin boys and they each had four daughters; these eight granddaughters of Gongsim were the first mudang and went on to spread Musok throughout Korea. Stories such as these may be relayed during certain mudang rituals; commonly, the story of Princess Pari is recited during gut rituals for the dead.

=== Birth and the dead ===
According to Korean traditional belief, after bodily death a person's soul must stand trial in court and pass through gates kept by the Ten Kings. At this court, the dead are judged for their conduct in life. The Ten Gates of Hell are regarded as places of punishment for the wicked, typified by grotesque and gory scenes.

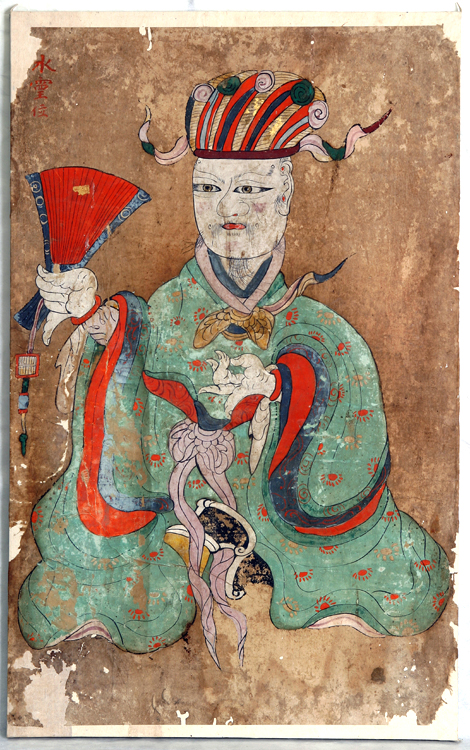
A painting of Suryeong, a village patron god of the Naewat-dang shrine, potentially dating from the 15th century

A common belief in Korean vernacular religion is that spirits of the dead may wander the human world before entering the afterlife. This is particularly the case for those who suffered a tragic or untimely death. These wandering spirits are called jabkwi, or sometimes kaeksa. These wandering dead are regarded as intrinsically dangerous to the living as their touch causes affliction, regardless of whether they mean harm or not. Such meddlesome ghosts are thought to often enter the house on a piece of cloth, clothing, or bright object.

Wandering ghosts can cause problems for their living descendants and thus must be dealt with through ritual. Those deemed especially problematic for the living family include individuals who have been given an unsuitable burial place, and those ghosts who died prematurely or otherwise feel their life was unfulfilled, such as grandparents who never saw their grandchildren, young people who died before they could marry, a first wife who was replaced by a second wife, and those who died by drowning.

When wandering ghosts are deemed troublesome, mudang are often deemed the best suited specialists for dealing with them; they can determine what these ghosts want and encourage them to leave. In other contexts, mudang have also performed rites to deal with spirits of the deceased. On Jeju Island, since the late 1980s there have been public lamentations of the dead involving simbang to mark those killed in the Jeju uprising of 1948.

== Practices ==
=== Mudang ===
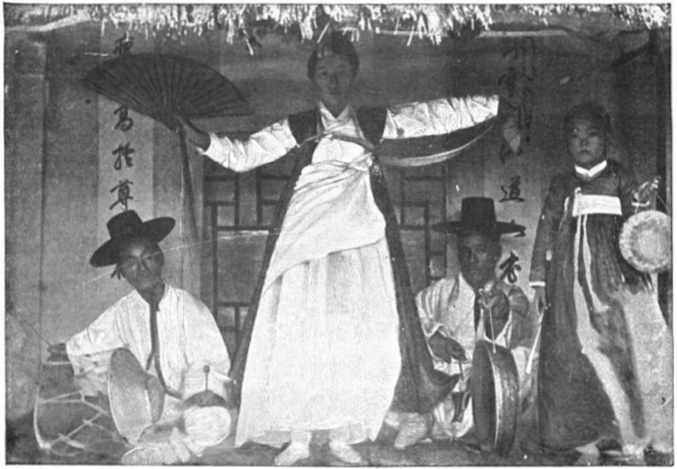
A mudang photographed in the early 20th century

The mudang mediate between the human and supernatural worlds, doing so to decrease human suffering and ensure a more harmonious life. Specifically, they interact with gods and ancestral spirits by divining their presence and will, performing small rituals to placate them and gain their favor, and overseeing the gut rituals to feast and entertain them. The mudang's ability to perform their rituals successfully is deemed to come from myŏnggi ('divine energy') bestowed upon them by the deities. Thus, divine favor must be gained through purification and supplication, prayer and pilgrimage.

For the mudang, ritual is an economic activity, and they operate as free agents rather than members of an ordained clergy. For many practitioners, being a mudang is a full-time job on which they financially depend, although some fail to earn a living through this ritual vocation. To succeed financially, mudang must attract regular clientele, and to that end modern South Korean practitioners have advertised their services in brochures, fliers, newspapers, and on the Internet. Some followers of Musok are unhappy with this situation, believing that the practice has degenerated under capitalism and modernisation; they feel that modern mudang display a more materialistic and self-interested approach than their historical predecessors.

Individual mudang can be regarded as having particular specialities. Mudang sometimes work in groups. This has been observed among simbang on Jeju, as well as mansin in Seoul. In the early 1990s, for example, a feminist group in Seoul sponsored several mudang to perform a gut ritual for the aggrieved souls of Korean "comfort women". When an arsonist torched Seoul's historic Namdaemun Gate in 2008, several mansin performed a ritual to appease spirits angered by the act.

==== Becoming a mudang ====
Many mudang report that they never wanted to take up the profession, resisting the calling due to the social disapproval that practitioners often face. However, Musok teaches that it is the deities who decide if a person is to become a mudang and that the former will torment an individual with misfortune, illness or madness to encourage them into adopting the profession. This process is termed the sinŭi kamul ('the drought caused by the gods'), sinbyŏng ('spirit possession sickness'), or mubyŏng ('mu sickness'). Mudang have for instance reported partial paralysis and hallucinations before turning to this ritual vocation, or else a compulsion to go to a shrine or sacred mountain. Alternatively, they have described encounters with spirits, sometimes while wandering in a wild environment, or otherwise through dreams, with dreams and visions sometimes revealing which deities the future mudang is expected to serve.

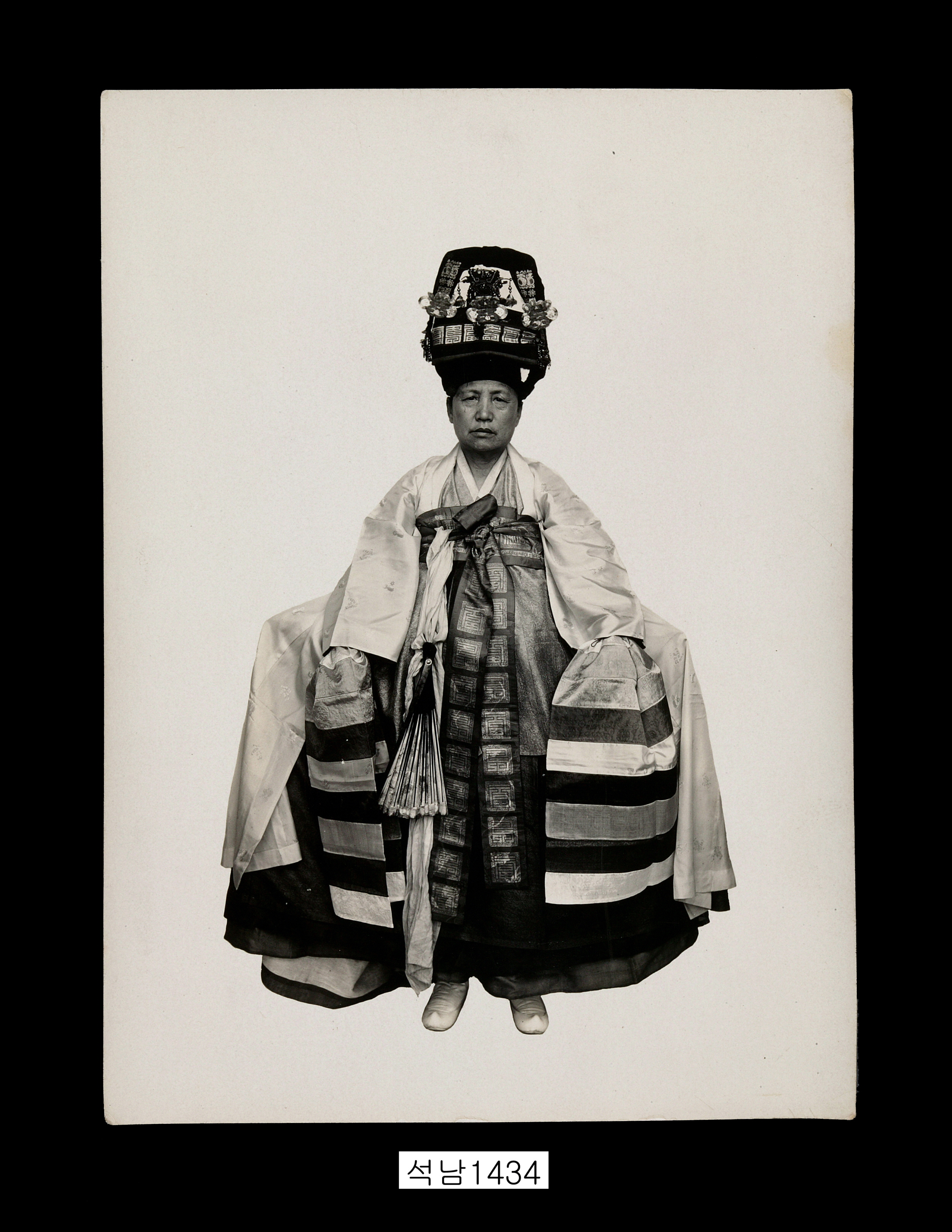
A mudang dressed as a barigongju.

Once an individual has accepted the call from the gods, they must find an established mudang willing to train them. They become this person's apprentice, the chagŭn mudang. Apprentices are usually aged over 18, although there are examples of children doing so. The teaching mudang is called a sineomeoni ('spirit mother'); their apprentice is termed a sinttal or sinddal ('spirit daughter') if female, or sinadul ('spirit son') if male. In the sesŭp-mu tradition, teachings are often passed down hereditarily, although in other instances a sesŭp-mu adopts a non-relative, rather than their child, as an apprentice. Not all practitioners want their children to follow them into the profession. When mudang do not wish a family member to continue their vocation, they may ensure that their ritual paraphernalia is burned or buried at their death; doing so severs any connection between their personal deities and their surviving family.

On completion of their training, an apprentice must perform an initiation ritual to open up malmun (the 'gates of speech'), thus allowing them to receive the words of the spirits. This rite is called the naerim gut. It involves the neophyte performing the appropriate chants, dances, and oracles to invoke and convey inspiration from the deities. If the initiate fails to perform this correctly, with the deities not opening their malmun, they will have to perform it again. Many mudang perform multiple naerim gut before being recognised as a properly initiated specialist. Those mudang who fail to learn how to deal with supernatural entities correctly are sometimes called ōngt'ōri by other practitioners.

==== Clients of the mudang ====
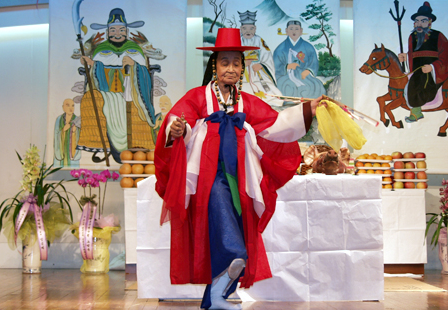
The mudang Oh Su-bok, mistress of the dodang-gut of Gyeonggi, holding a service to placate angry spirits of the dead.

Serving private clients is the core practice for most mudang, even those who have built celebrity status through their performance of staged gut. In some areas, including Jeju, clients are called tan'gol. Clients seek solutions to their practical problems, typically hoping that the mudang can ascertain the cause of misfortune they have suffered. Common reasons for doing so include recurring nightmares, concerns about a child getting into university, financial woes, business concerns, or physical ailments. Some clients turn to the mudang after being dissatisfied with the diagnosis or treatment administered by medical professionals.

Although both sexes do consult mudang, most clients are female. From his fieldwork in the 1990s, Chongho Kim found that most clients were women in their late fifties and early sixties, while that same decade Kendall noted that most clients in Seoul and its environs were small entrepreneurs, such as owners of small companies, shops, and restaurants. By the early 21st century, Sarfati observed, many young people had become clients of mudang as part of a spiritual search or for counselling. Clients do not generally regard themselves as being committed exclusively to Musok, and may deem themselves Buddhists or Christians, but mudang often think that their rituals will please the spirits regardless of their client's beliefs.

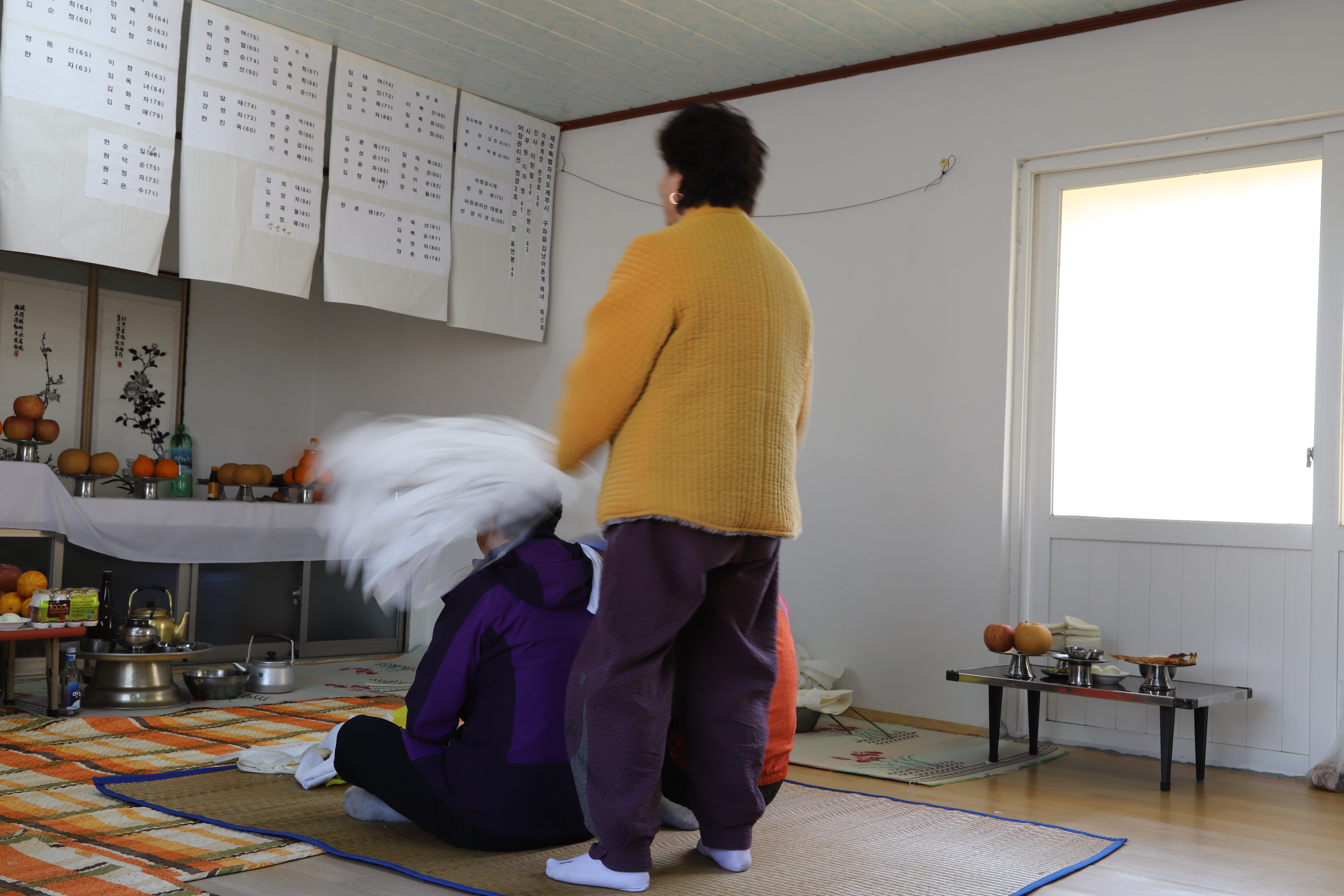
A client undergoing a procedure with a mudang in 2019

A client will often arrive, greet the mudang, and then engage in an introductory conversation. Through this, the mudang will hope to ascertain more about the client and their problems. The mudang then uses divination and trance visions to determine the source of their client's trouble; in Musok, neglecting ancestors and gods is seen as the primary cause of affliction. The mudang may then try to convince their client of the need for a particular ritual to treat their problem.

If a ritual fails to produce the desired result, the client may speculate that it was because of a bad performer, errors in the ritual, the presence of a ritually polluted attendee, or a lack of sincerity on their part. If the client feels the mudang has not successfully solved their problem, they may turn to another mudang. They may be disappointed or angry given their substantial financial investment; in some rare cases clients have sued mudang. The payment of money is often a source of mistrust between clients and mudang. Concerns about money are heightened by the lack of an "institutional buffer" between the client and ritual practitioner, such as a temple or church.

=== Altars and shrines ===
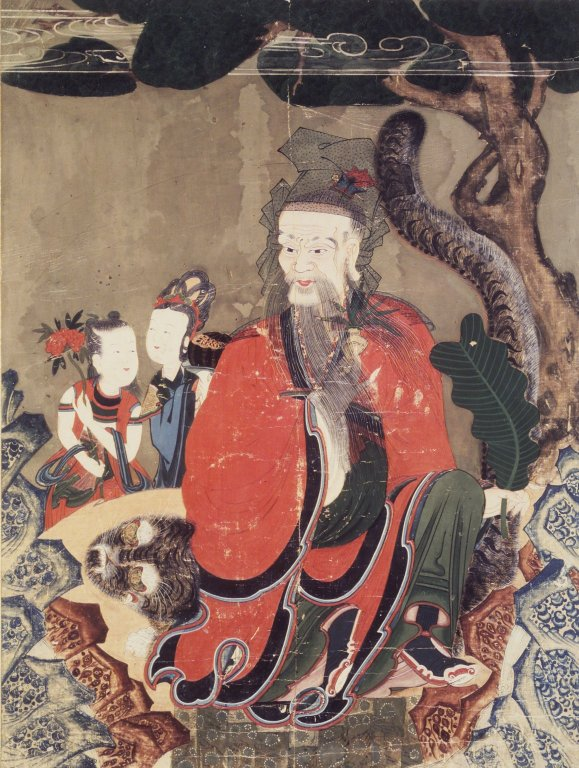
A 19th-century musindo painting of a sansin (mountain spirit), on display at the Brooklyn Museum; images like this often appeared on altars

Most Musok rituals center around altars—referred to as sinbang, harabŏjiŭibang, or pŏptang—and which serve as places for mudang to engage with supernatural beings. Mudang typically have a shrine in their home in which they host various gods and ancestors, sometimes set up in a cabinet. Shrines might alternatively be found outdoors, often incorporating a stone or old tree, while a mudang will often establish a temporary altar in a client's home.

While each altar often has its own idiosyncratic elements, they are typically dominated by bright, primary colors, in contrast to the muted earth tones traditionally predominant in Korean daily life. This home shrine may include paintings of deities, called musindo, taenghwa, musokhwa, or sinhwa. These paintings are particularly important in the Musok traditions of Seoul and of the northwest provinces Hwanghae and P'yŏngan; they were traditionally not found in parts of the south. Hanging above the altar, they are usually considered the most important objects present. They are regarded as seats for the deities, literally manifesting the latter's presence rather than just visually depicting them, an idea similar to those found across much of Asia, as in Buddhism and Hinduism. As well as being invited to inhabit a painting, a deity may also be petitioned to depart it; they are sometimes believed to leave of their own accord, for instance if they abandon a mudang who keeps the image.

Musindo paintings range from being crude to more sophisticated. Traditionally they use colors associated with the five directions: red, blue/green, yellow, white, and black. Painters who produce musindo are traditionally expected to adhere to standards of purity while producing these artworks, bathing beforehand and refraining from eating fish or meat. Since the 1970s, musindo have commonly been produced in commercial workshops, although a small number of traditional artists remain in South Korea. After a mudang's death, their musindo were often ritually de-animated and then burned during the 20th century. Some musindo have been donated to museums; certain Musok practitioners believe that the deity leaves the image if that occurs.

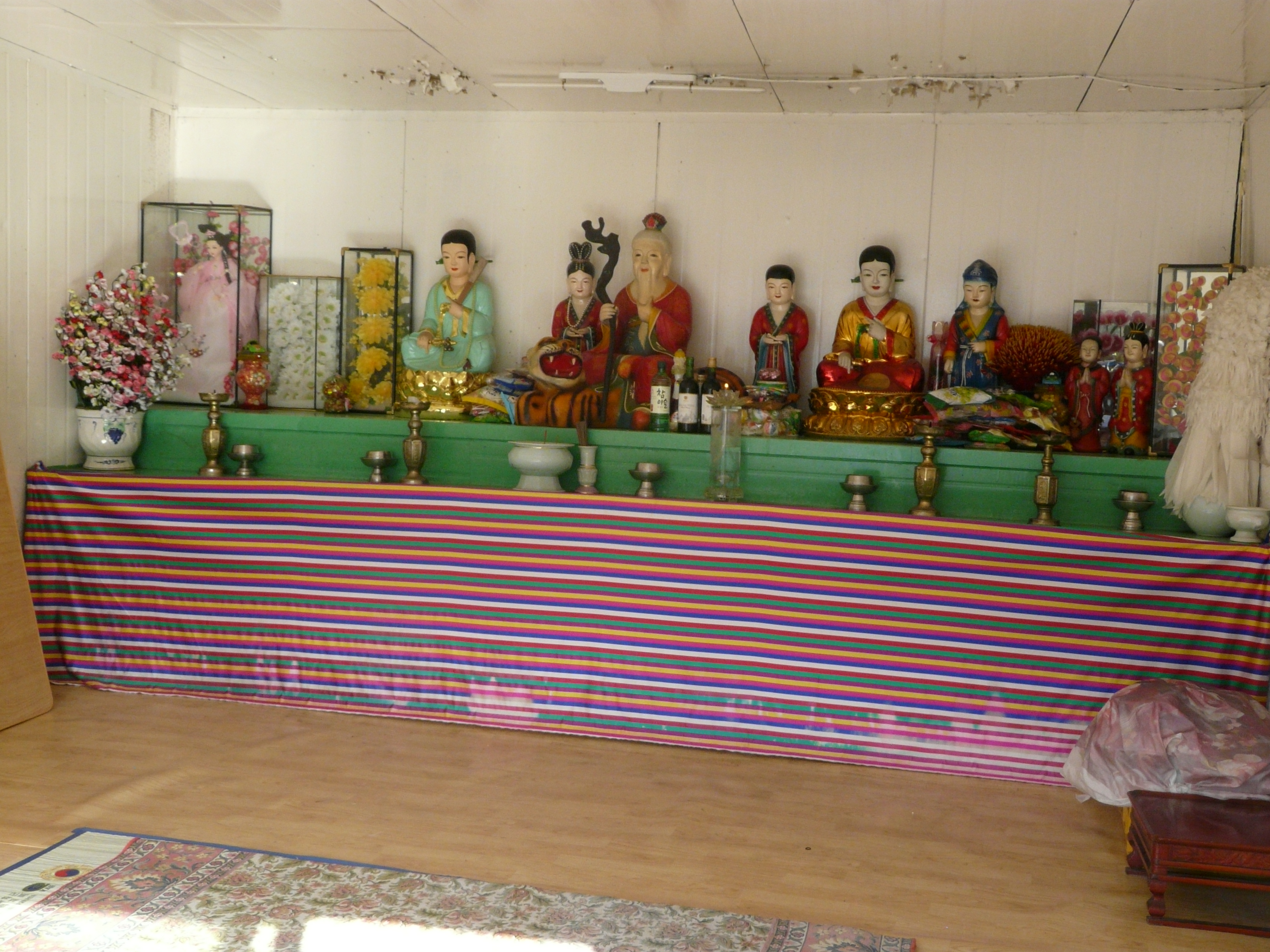
Shrine in the guttang at Ansan, featuring statues of various deities.

On the shrine, deities may also be represented by sinsang, statues made of wood, plastic, clay, straw, or metal. Alternatively, deities may be represented by a white piece of paper, the kŭlbal or kŭlmun, onto which the entity's name is written in black or red ink. The deity may instead be seated in physical objects, including stones, clothing, coins, dolls, or knives; these may be concealed from view, for instance being wrapped in cloth or inside a chest. In addition to entities associated with Musok specifically, shrines may also include images of Buddhist deities. Alongside representations of such beings, shrines typically have candles, incense holders, and offering bowls; there may also be toys or dolls to amuse the child gods. The mudang's altar will additionally often have storage for their ritual paraphernalia, such as costumes.

To sustain their ongoing favor, mudang often worship their deities daily. They commonly bow when in the presence of their home shrine, before placing offerings upon it. Some offerings, such as cooked rice, fruit, and water, may be changed daily; others, such as sweets, cigarettes, and liquor, may be replaced more infrequently. Mudang maintain that they provide offerings in thanks for the work their deities have brought them. For visiting clients, who may also place offerings at a mudang's home-shrine, a large assortment of offerings thus gives the impression of a financially successful ritual specialist.

Deities are often deemed present in all houses. Historical accounts reference the presence of earthen jars (tok, hangari, tanji) filled with grain, or smaller baskets or pouches, as offerings to household deities and ancestors. This practice was declining in South Korea by the 1960s and 1970s. By the latter decades of the 20th century, cardboard boxes had become common receptacles for these household offerings. Some mudang have suggested that, because most South Koreans now live in apartments, the Sŏngju must be venerated in a way that ensures it is mobile and can be transported to a new home.

==== Guttang and pugundang ====
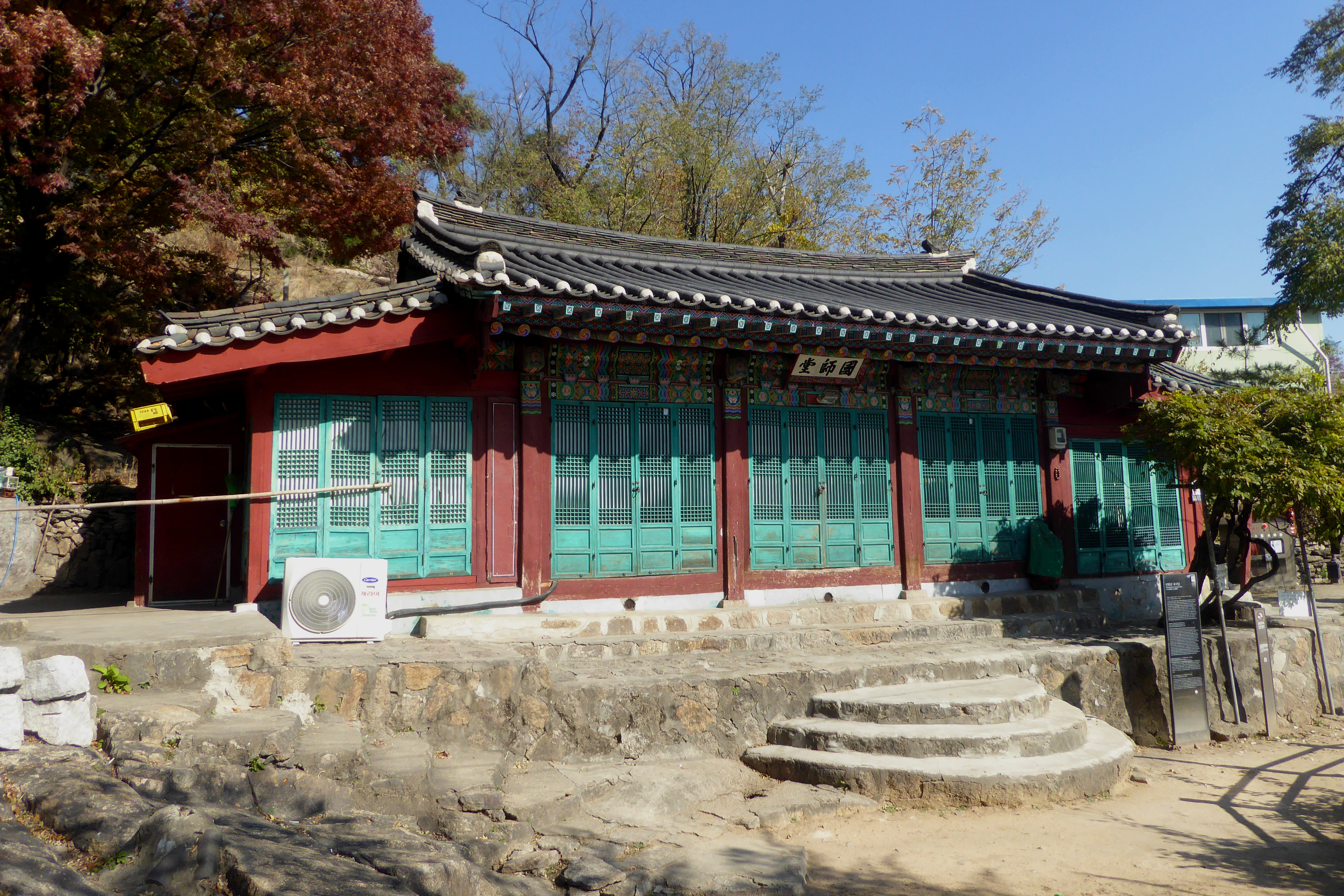
The Guksadang shrine is located on Inwang Mountain, Seoul; Kendall noted that many mudang "regard the Guksadang as Korea's premier guttang."

Specialised buildings at which Musok rituals are performed are called guttang or gut dang and are typically found on mountains. Guttang are often identified on the exterior by a t'aegŭk symbol, a circular swirl of red, blue, and yellow that symbolizes the cosmos. The main ritual room is called the gut bang, and often contains a table on which offerings are placed. Mudang often rent a guttang to perform their rituals, especially if they do not have space for such rites in their home.

Practitioners often believe that deities communicate with humans through dreams as a means of choosing specific locales for the placement of guttang. Some are located at especially auspicious places, such as at an area below a mountain, the myŏngdang, where positive spiritual energy is thought to congregate. Guttang sometimes move over time. The Guksadang, which Kendall described as "Seoul's most venerable guttang", for instance was originally on South Mountain, before being displaced by a Shinto shrine during the Japanese occupation, at which it moved to Inwangsan, a mountain to the north of the city. The growing urbanisation of South Korea since the late 20th century has meant that many are now surrounded by other buildings, sometimes including other guttang. The increasingly cramped nature of Korean urban living may have encouraged the increasing popularity of guttang in isolated locations like mountains.

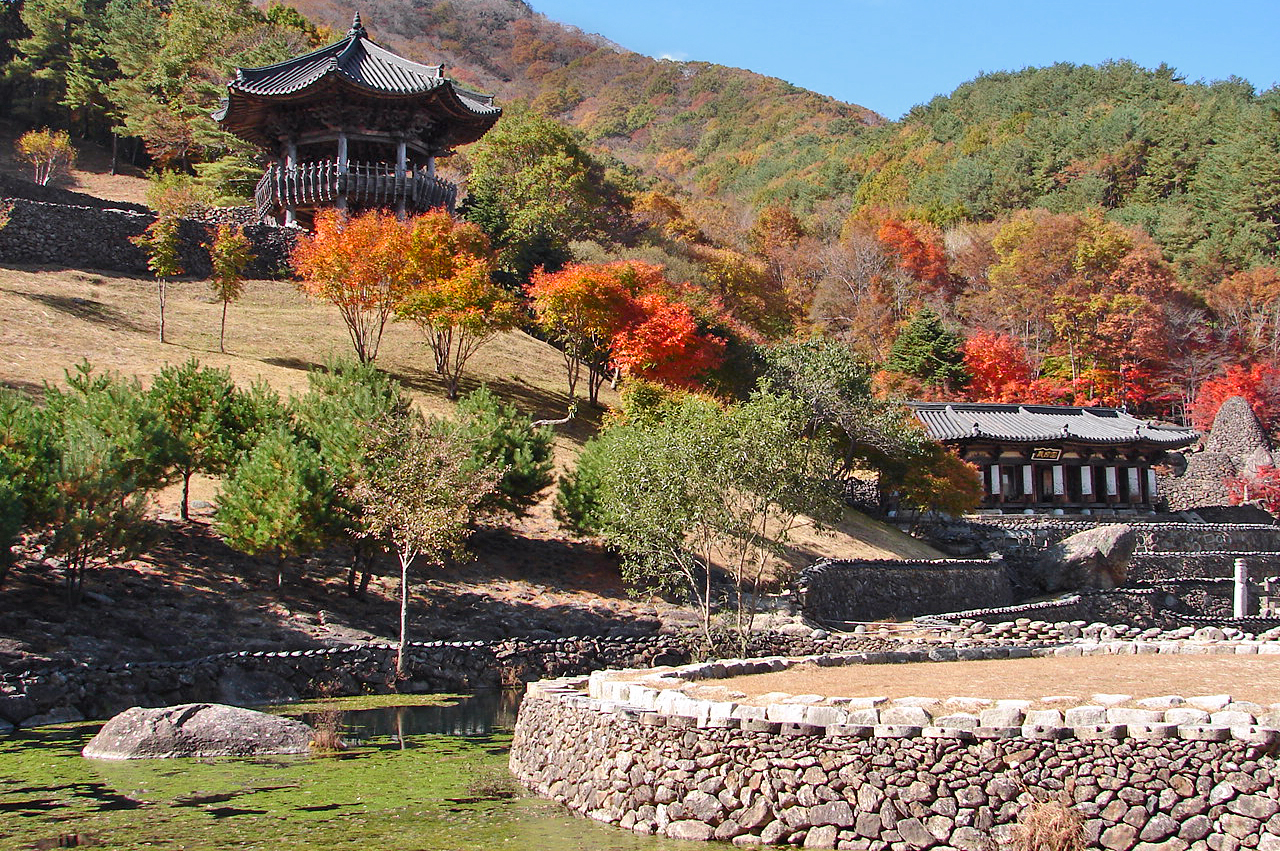
Gardens of the Samseonggung, a shrine for the worship of Hwanin, Hwanung and Dangun.

Guttang often operate as businesses. They rent out rooms for mudang to use, a practice perhaps originating in the late Joseon period. The guttang will have a shrine keeper, who may be a mudang themselves. Other staff based there may include musicians called chaebi, cooks who prepare food for gut rituals, and a maid, the kongyangju, who is a trainee mudang yet to undergo their initiation rite. As well as spaces for ritual, guttang also provide places for networking, allowing mudang to witness the rituals of other practitioners and observe different regional styles.

Shrines dedicated to significant tutelary spirits are known as tang or pugundang. Historically, these were often the foci for local cults, such as those devoted to apotheosised heroes. In parts of South Korea, as on Jeju Island, new village shrines have continued to be created into the early 21st century, with various Jeju villages having more than one shrine.

=== Gut rites ===
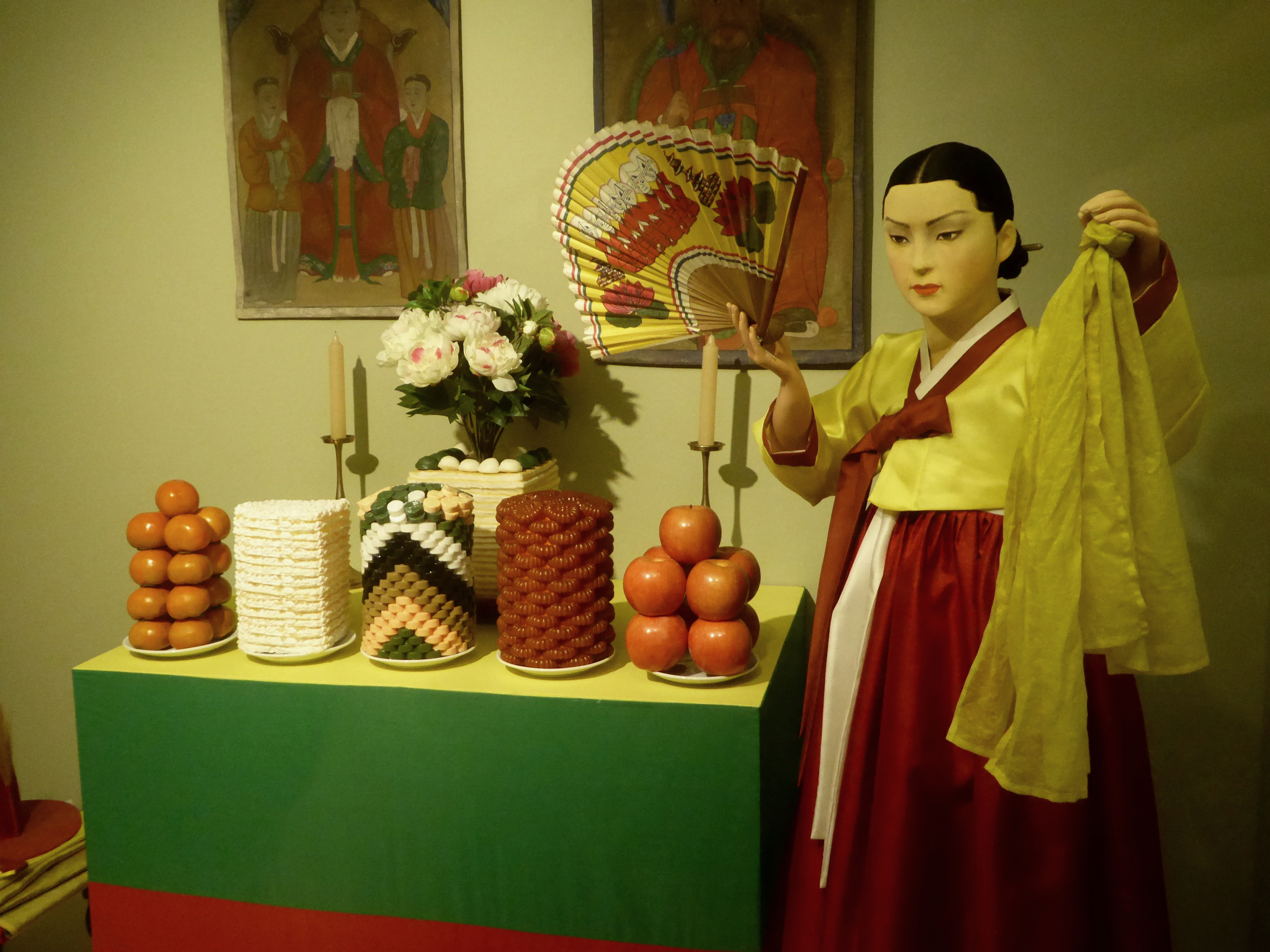
Diorama of a gut inside the National Museum of Korea, Seoul

The mudang's central ritual is called gut. These are large-scale rites, sometimes lasting up to several days, and are characterised by rhythmic movements, songs, oracles and prayers. Rather than being rooted in a prescribed liturgy, they are usually performance-focused. The only rituals in traditional Korean religion believed to give supernatural entities the ability to speak directly to humans, they accord central importance to a reciprocal transaction between humans and supernatural beings. The purpose of a gut is to get the supernatural beings to communicate, expressing what they want and why they are angry.

There is regional diversity in the styles of gut, although some mudang mix different styles, with each gut displaying features unique to its particular circumstances. Each gut is sponsored for a specific purpose, often in response to a client's illness, domestic quarrel, or financial loss. It might be undertaken to propitiate the spirit of a deceased family member, or to increase prosperity and good fortune; in the 21st century, it has become increasingly common to sponsor a gut to mark a new financial venture, such as the opening of a mall or an office building. As well as being performed for clients, the mudang will sometimes perform these rituals for their own personal reasons; in the 1990s, for instance, the prominent mudang Kim Kŭm-hwa performed a gut for Korean reunification.

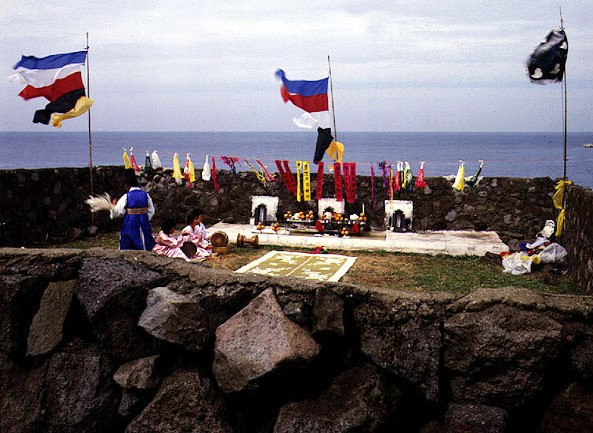
A gut held on Jeju Island in 2006.

Financial payment for a gut is typical. The fee varies between mudang and the circumstances of the rite, although a gut is usually very expensive for the client. The precise fee may be negotiated between the mudang and their client, sometimes involving haggling. This will usually be agreed at a pre-gut consultation. As well as paying for the mudang's time, the fee covers the wages of any assistants and the costs of material used in the rite; it may also reflect the years of training they have undertaken to be able to perform these rituals.

The gut is usually held in private and few have a larger audience than the direct participants like the client. Occasionally, a client may invite neighbors to observe; they are usually thought unsuitable for children to attend. On occasion, a busy client will not attend the gut they have sponsored. Often it will take place outdoors and at night, in an isolated rural location, at a guttang shrine rented for the occasion, or in a private home, either that of the mudang, or that of their client.

==== Preparing the gut ====
Setting up the gut may involve not only the mudang but also their apprentices, assistants, musicians, butchers, and cooks. Preparing and decorating the space is deemed a meaningful part of the ritual process, with those setting it up often concerned so as not to offend the spirits. Taking part in the ritual requires purification; before any gut is performed, the altar is purified by fire and water. Often, this entails burning white paper, for white is regarded as a symbol of purity.

Colorful paintings of the gods will often be brought into the space where the gut is to be performed; this is not part of the gut performed by Jeju simbang. God paintings are usually paper, although in modern contexts are sometimes polyester, ensuring that they are resistant to rain and tearing. Other practitioners regard the use of polyester images as a corruption of tradition. These images are then often hung on a metal frame. In Taejŏn City and Ch'ungch'ŏng province, a traditional practice involves decorating the ritual space with handmade mulberry paper cut into patterns. Various ritual items may be included in the gut ritual, including swords, a drum, drum stick, the spirit stick, and the samjichang, the latter a three-pronged spear. The chukwonmun is a prayer card used in the gut onto which information like the client's name may be written. The chukwonmun may then be attached to a drum.

==== Offerings at the gut ====
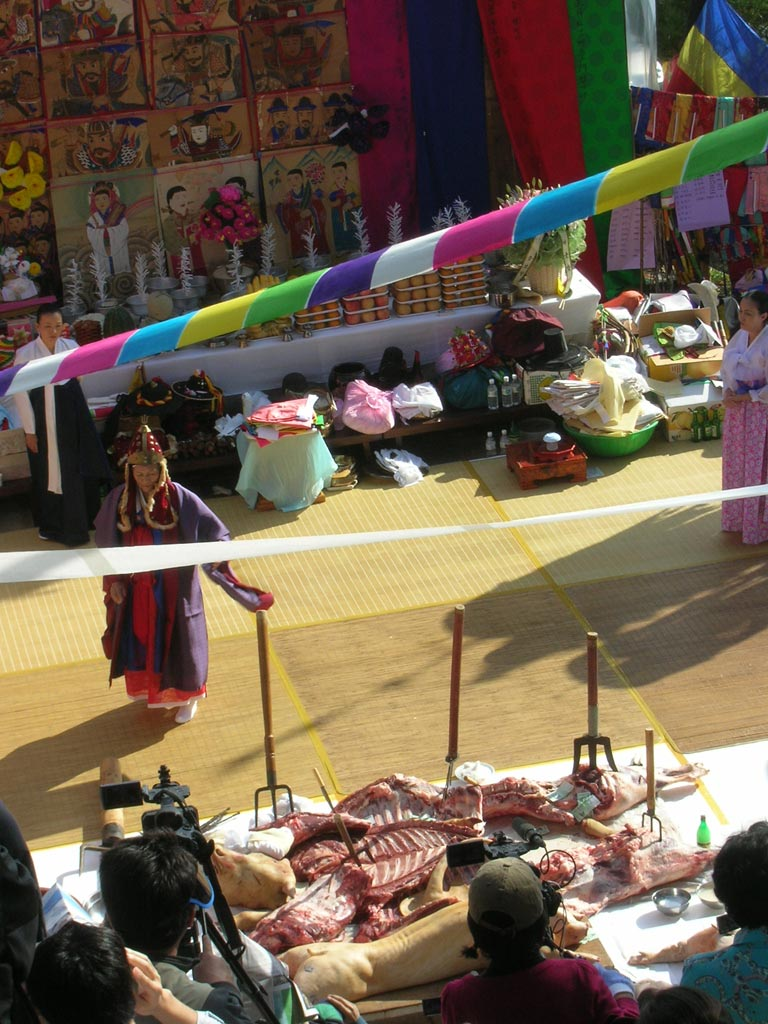
A gut performed in South Korea in 2007, showing the offering of meat to the spirits

At a gut, food is offered to supernatural beings, some of it cooked but some raw. This often includes fish, rice, tteok rice cakes, eggs, sweets, nuts, biscuits, fruit, and meat. To provide meat, animal sacrifice occurs at most gut; a cow or pig killed for the purpose may be butchered in the shrine room. The carcass may be impaled on the trident; if it fails to balance, this is seen as evidence that the deities do not accept the offering. When the ritual is intended to invoke Buddhist spirits, the food offerings may be vegetarian; offering these entities meat would offend them. Food offerings may also be set out for wandering spirits attracted by the ritual, an act designed to avoid mishaps they could cause.

Offered alongside the food will often be alcoholic drinks, typically soju, and non-food items like incense, cloth, money (both real and imitation), and paper flowers. The color of the flowers may indicate to whom they are offered; pink for the spirits of military generals, white for Buddhist deities, and multi-colored for ancestral spirits. The material used for the gut will often be bought in a manmulsang shop, which specialises in religious paraphernalia. In modern South Korea, this ritual paraphernalia used is often of poor quality because it is intended to be burnt following the ceremony.

Offerings may be placed on tables; one table will be the halabeoji sang, devoted to the Musok gods, while the other table will be the jasang sang, devoted to ancestral spirits. The mudang will often perform divination to determine if the offerings have been accepted by the supernatural beings. It is considered important for the person giving these offerings to do so with sincerity and devotion, with the mudang undertaking a form of divination called "weighing the sincerity" (chŏngsŏng kŭllyang) to determine if this has been the case. The emotional influence on the audience is considered evidence of its efficacy.

During the ritual, attendees may be expected to give money to the mudang, often while the latter are possessed, intended as thanks both to them and to the spirits. These offerings, given in addition to the ritual fee, are called pyŏlbi or kajŏn. Any real money presented as offerings to the deities will be taken by the mudang.

==== Performance at the gut ====
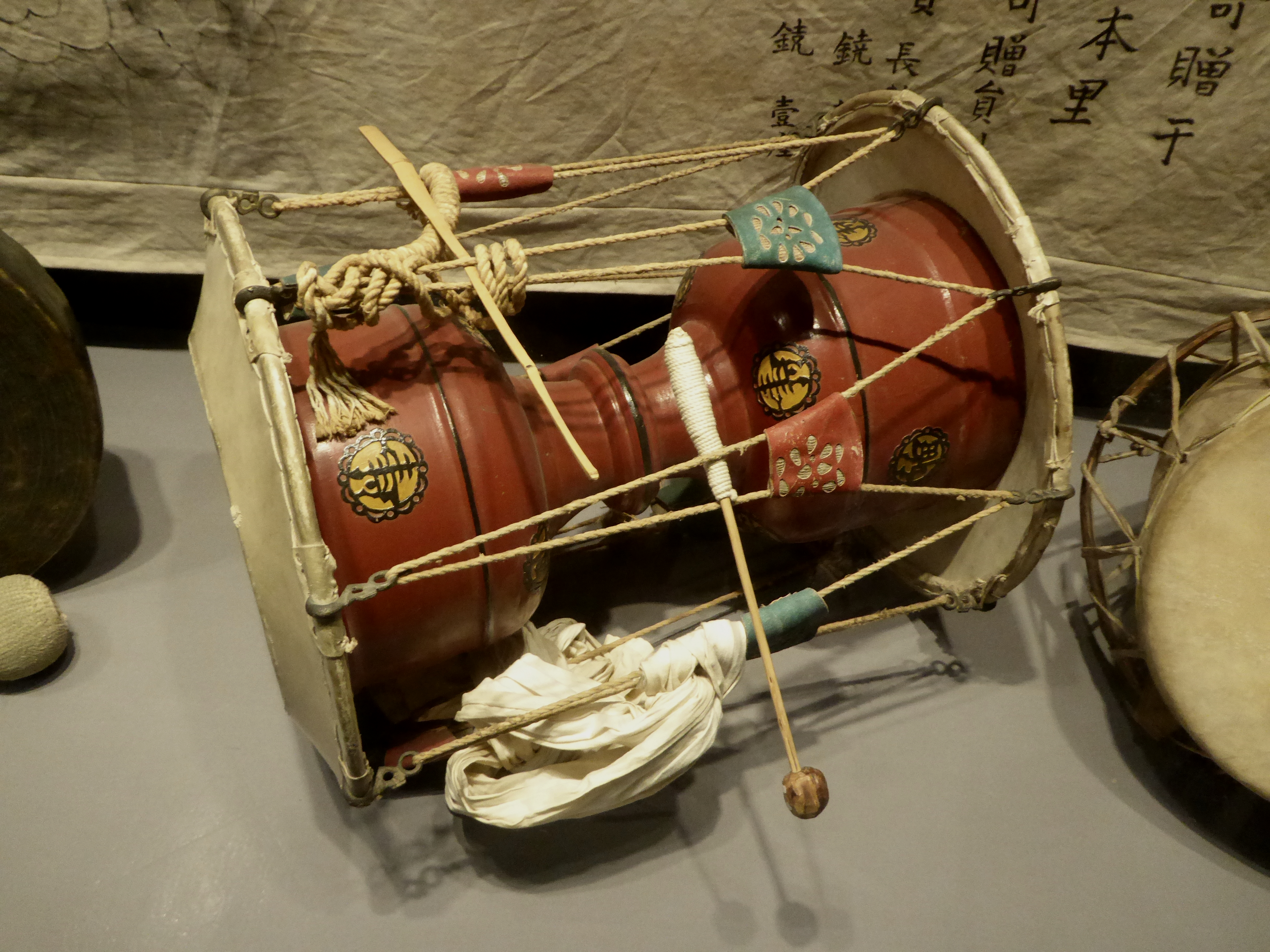
A janggu drum, on display at the National Museum of Korea in Seoul

The mudang begins their rite by inviting supernatural entities to the altar and then setting out to entertain them. Music is common, regularly involving cymbals, hourglass-shaped drums called changgu, and a gong. Also sometimes featured is a pipe, the piri. The gut will often begin with drumming, to which the mudang will dance by swirling in circles, something believed to facilitate the possession trance. They may hold nŏk-chong, short sticks to which white paper streamers are attached; this helps channel the spirits into the mudang's body. The mudang may also carry a fan and brass bells; Sarfati commented that these bells were "a central symbol" of Musok, and their purpose is to attract the attention of the spirits.

The language used by a mudang during their rite is called mudang sori ("mudang's sounds"), and is often deliberately archaic. The songs or chants employed are called muga, with each practitioner having their own personal repertoire, largely inherited through oral tradition. As well as traditional folk songs, some mudang have sung pop songs to entertain the spirits. Incantations and ritual words for communicating with the spirit are called chukeon. The mudang will often recite mythological stories during the ritual, something deemed to contribute to its efficacy. These may be recited in full at a longer ritual or in condensed form for a shorter one. There may be breaks during the gut, for instance giving time for the participants to eat.

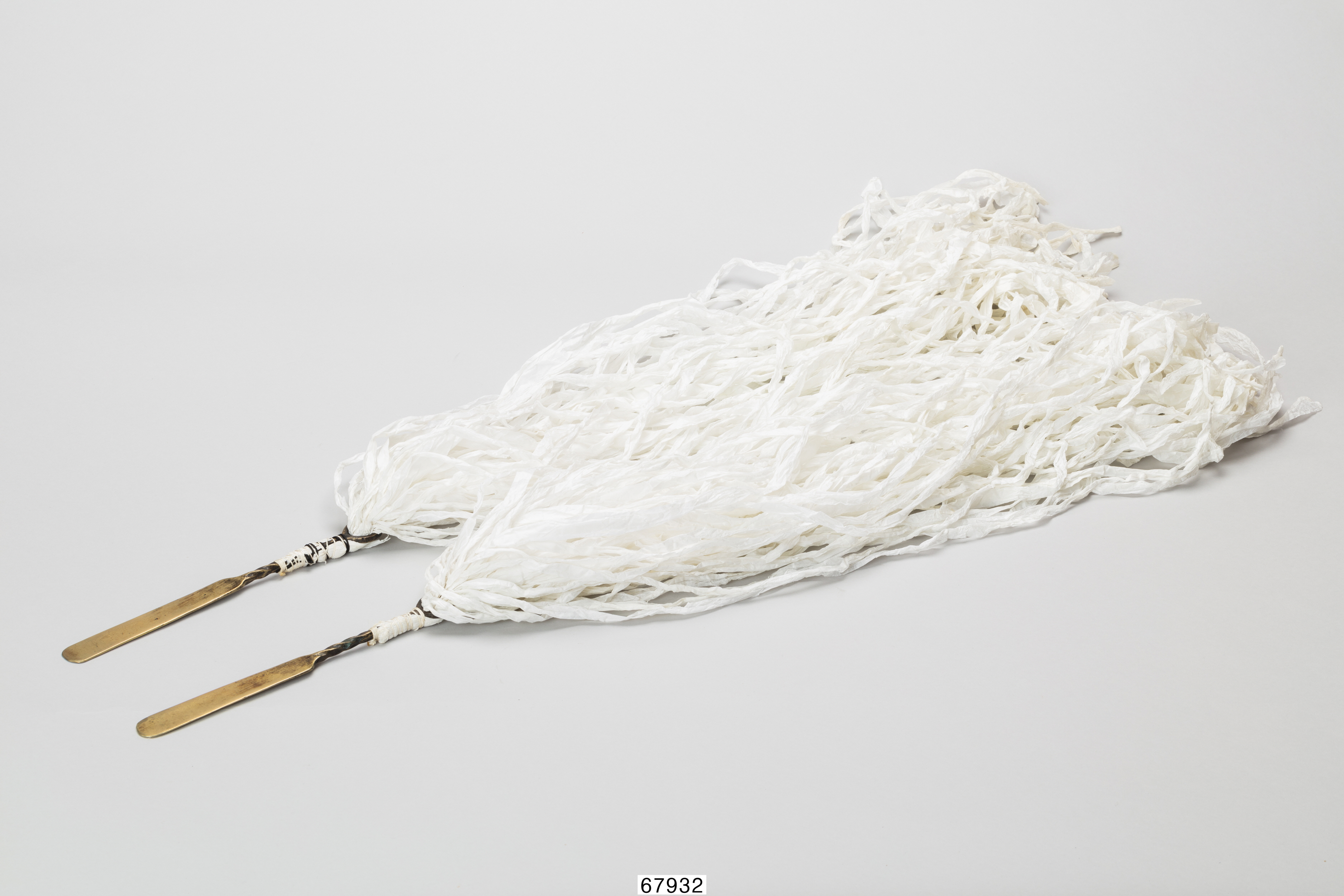
Sticks with white paper streamers are used by mansin to channel the spirits into their body

The costumes worn for these rituals are called sinbok. These colorful outfits resemble those documented from the 19th and early 20th centuries, and may involve a hanbok. The mansin may distinguish themselves from their assistants by having their hair in the Tchokchin mŏri style. Male mudang often wear female clothing and makeup when performing rituals, reflecting their possession of a female momjusin. Female mudang may show an interest in smoking, drinking alcohol, and playing with bladed weapons, reflecting that they have a male momjusin. In Korean society, there have been persistent rumours about the toleration of homosexuality within Musok practitioners. For the gut, the mudang will dress in clothes representing the deities, with different deities associated with different items of clothing. They may change outfit over the course of the gut to reflect the different entities possessing them. This is not a practice that the sesup mu engage in.

Also used in many gut are chaktu blades, objects symbolizing the bravery of the possessing warrior spirits. The mudang may stab themselves in the chest with the knives, run the blade along their tongue, or press it to their face and hands. Riding knives is termed jakdugeori and involves the mudang walking barefoot on the upturned blade of the knife, sometimes while speaking in gongsu, or possessed speech. Practitioners claim that it is the spirits that prevent the mudang from being cut by the blade, and the ability to undertake such dangerous acts without harm is regarded as evidence for the efficacy of the rite. Some practitioners acknowledge instances in which they have been cut by the blades. Jakdugeori has become an expected part of staged or cinematic gut.

==== Possession and ending the gut ====
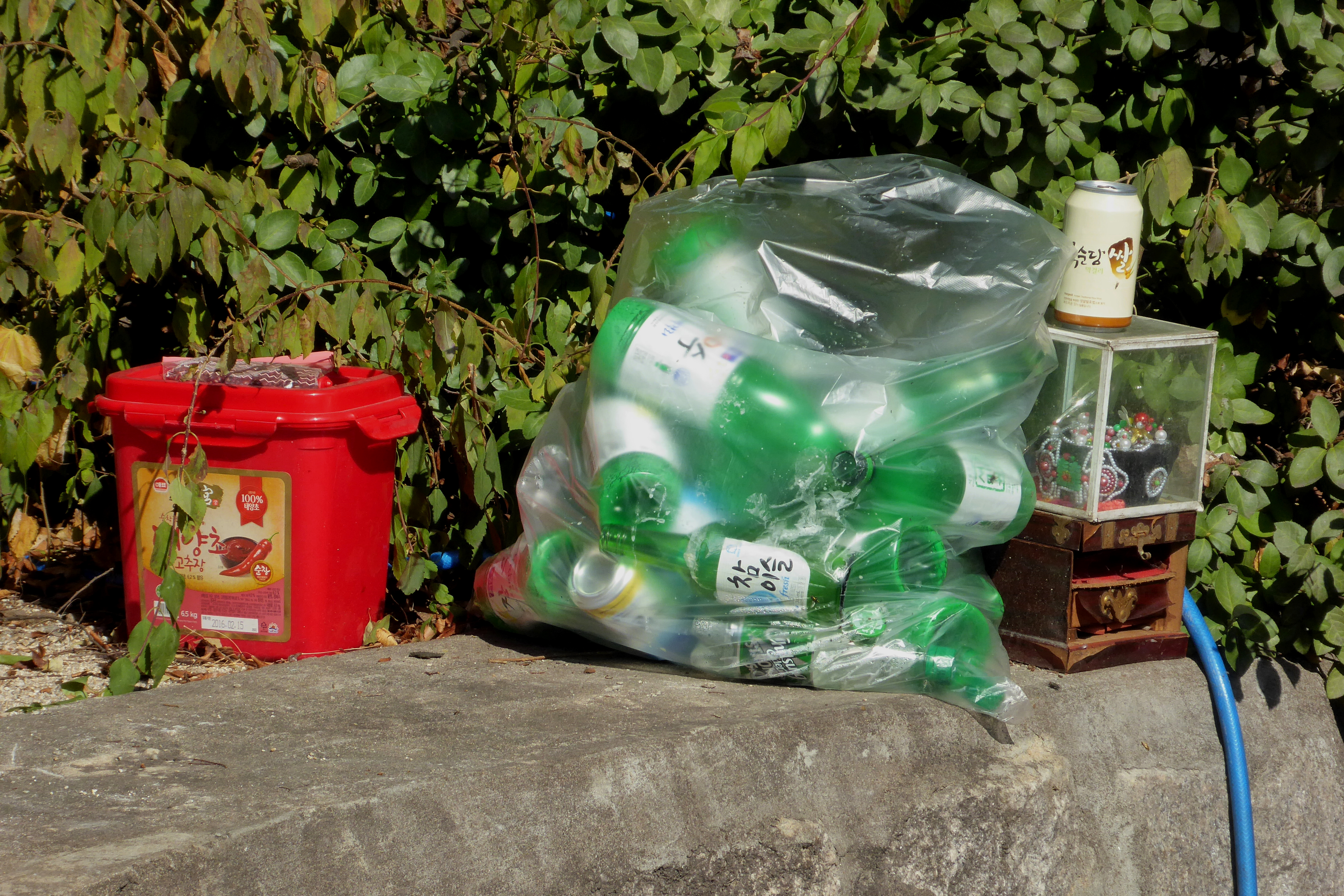
Discarded soju bottles outside the Guksadang, having been used as offerings

The ritual typically climaxes with the possession of the mudang. In some gut traditions, the mudang will stand upon an earthen jar while doing so. The term sin-naerim (descending of the spirits) describes possession of the mansin, intended in a manner that is largely controlled. Possessed speech is called kongsu; words from the possessing entity will then be spoken to the assembled persons by the mudang. Over the course of a gut, a mansin may be possessed by a succession of different supernatural entities. On Jeju, the simbang will provide a voice for the spirits. Yun noted that the simbang's "so-called medium speech" typically lacked the "dramatic intensity" of the messages conveyed by the kangsin-mu. The entities possessing the mudang will typically dispense advice to the ritual's sponsor and to other attendees. Supernatural beings will often relate that if a gut had been performed earlier, misfortune would not have befallen the person sponsoring the gut.

The final phase of the gut entails sending off the spirits who have been summoned, often by burning name tags, the josang ot ("clothes for ancestors") or cloth, straw shoes, and imitation money. Towards the end of the gut, wandering spirits that may have gathered are expelled, talismans may be distributed to attendees, and finally the mudang will remove their ceremonial clothing. At the end of the ritual, some of the food may be left to decay. Much of it will also be distributed to attendees, having been charged with auspiciousness by its use in the rite. Attendees may give some of this food to non-attendees once they get home; they may also set some aside to feed wandering spirits that might have followed them from the gut.

==== Styles of gut ====
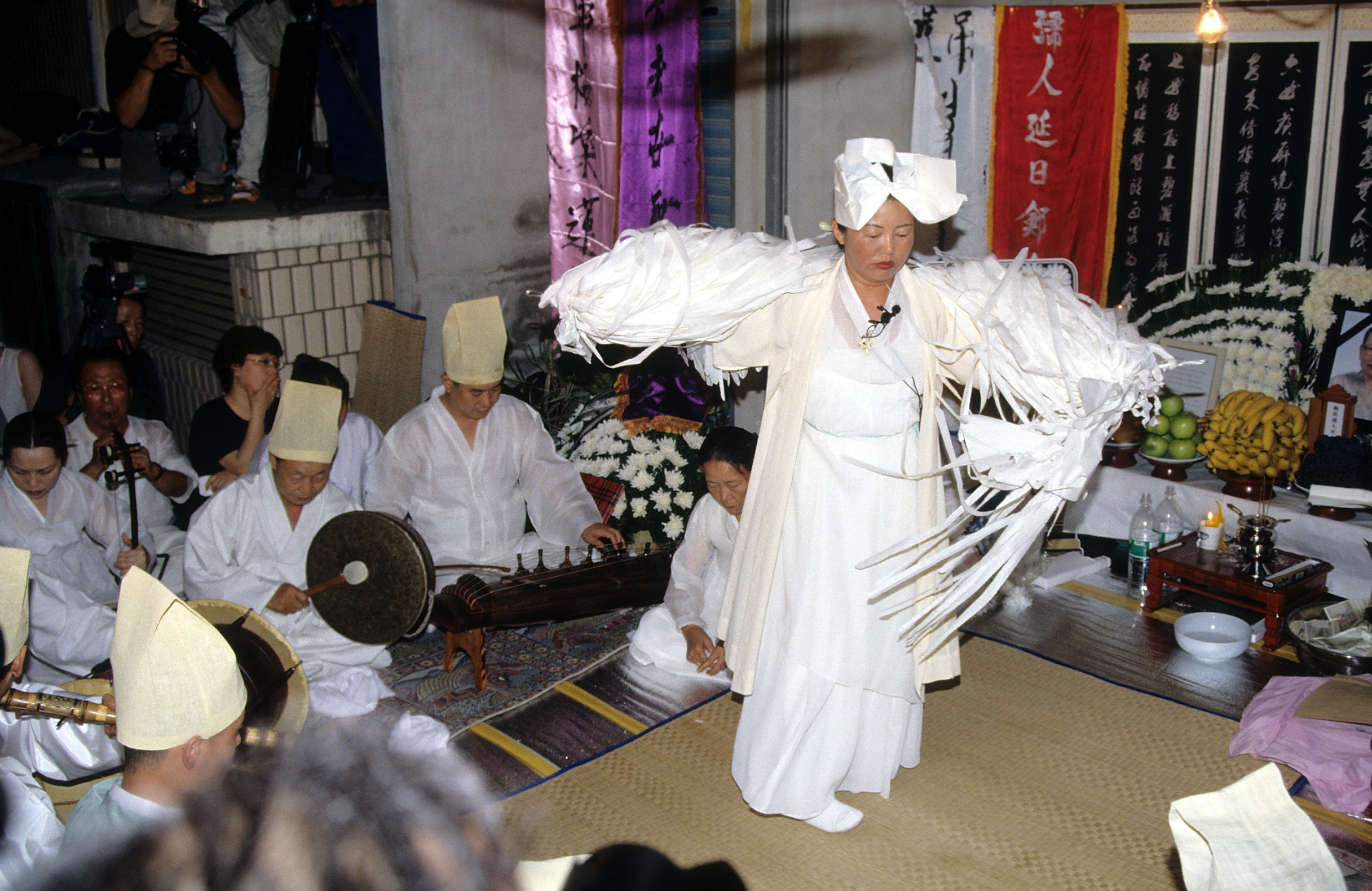
A Jindo Ssitgimgut (Purification Gut of Jindo) performed in 2001

Different types of gut have different names, often reflecting the principle deity being honoured or the purpose of the rite. The chesu gut is for good fortune, while the uhwan gut is for healing. The chinogi gut is performed to send ancestors to a good afterlife. The ch'a kosa honors the spirits of a new car and became increasingly popular as car ownership grew in late 20th century South Korea.

The kkonmaji gut or flower-greeting gut is an annual rite held by a mudang to entertain and feed their gods, ancestors, and clients. The sin gut are performed in gratitude to the deities and ancestors for granting a mudang their spiritual power and thus a livelihood. They are regarded as returning to these supernatural beings a portion of what the mudang has earned. The sin gut can sometimes last 10 days. The byong gut is a ritual for expelling bad spirits, sometimes from a human. This sometimes involves the spirit forcing it into a bottle. The mich'in gut is performed for a person who is mentally afflicted and often thought possessed by one or more spirits. The possessing spirit is offered food to encourage it to leave; sometimes scraps of food are thrown at the afflicted person. By 2009, South Korea's government recognised ten regional gut styles as parts of the country's intangible cultural heritage, and that year one of these traditions – the Yŏngdŭng gut performed at Ch'ilmŏri Shrine on Jeju – was added to UNESCO's Representative List of the Intangible Cultural Heritage of Humanity.

Historically, the gut may have had entertainment value when there were few other outlets. Since the late 20th century, gut performed primarily for entertainment purposes are referred to as gut gongyeon. Some practitioners who perform both draw a clear distinction between them, although many mudang still regard staged gut as genuine interactions with spirits. Performed in museums or at city festivals, these gut often take place on raised stages surrounded by a seated audience, typically attracting journalists, scholars, and photographers. Gut gongyeon are often performed for their artistic value, commonly being dedicated to general causes such as national prosperity; sometimes the food placed as an offering is fake. They often involve folklorists or other scholars who explain the ritual to the audience. Mudang may see these staged rituals as an opportunity to attract potential new clients, uploading videos of them performing such rites to social media and YouTube.

=== Mountains, landscape, and pilgrimage ===
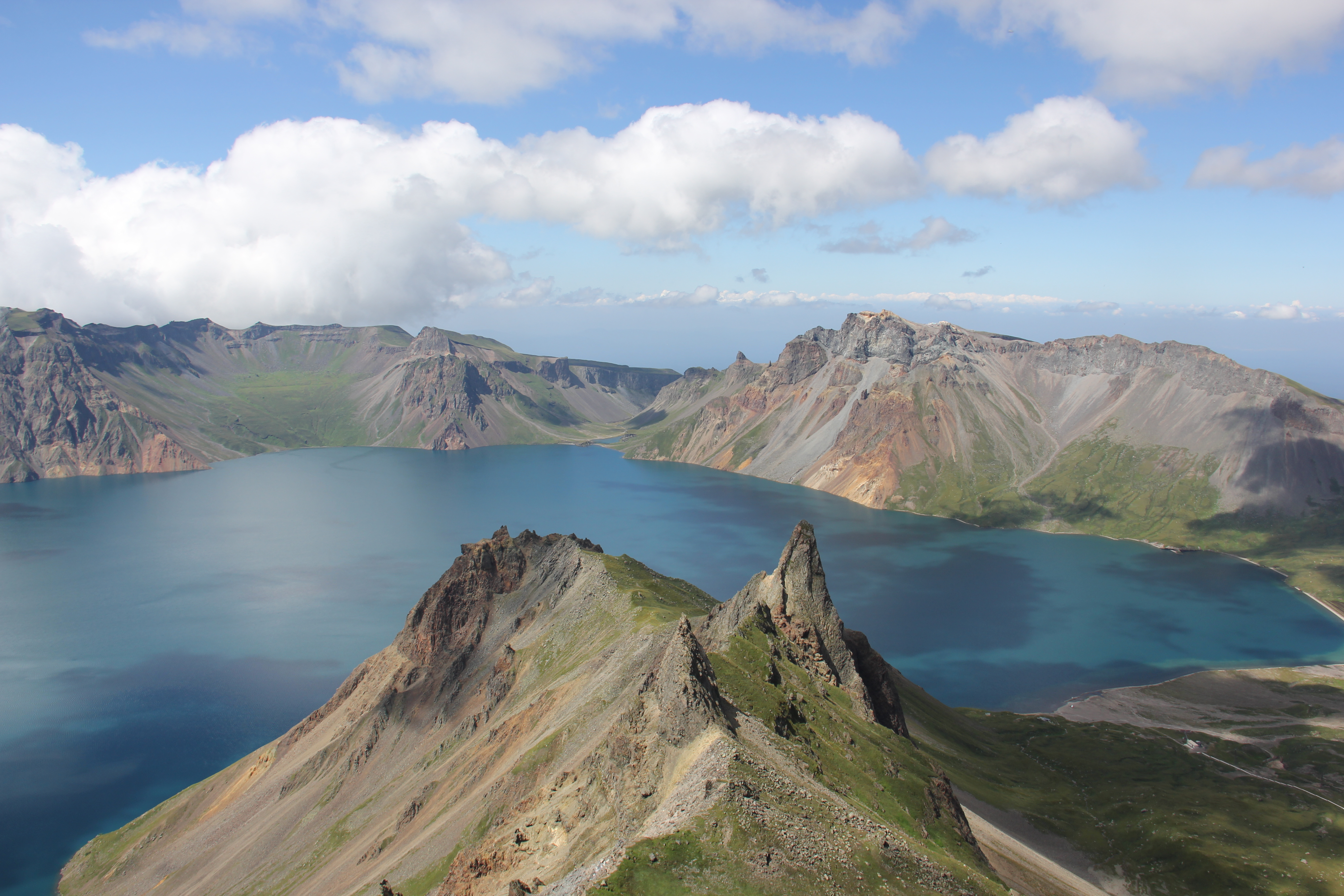
The lake atop Mount Paektu, which has a prominent place in Musok

In Musok, spiritually potent sites include rocks, springs, and sŏn'ang trees, the latter sometimes demarcated with affixed strips of cloth or paper. Mountains are deemed places of sacred presence and associated with Musok's origin. The levels of spiritual power at a mountain are influenced not just by its associated deities but also an energy, ki (the equivalent of the Chinese qi), that is present there. This ki is believed to channel through maek ("veins") permeating the mountain landscape; these can be disrupted by roads or other construction. Thus, the potency of these mountains is thought to decline amid growing urbanisation and tourist access. In Korea, this traditional geomancy is called p'ungsu and is akin to the Chinese fengshui.

Pilgrimages to mountain shrines have long been part of Korean religion. Historically, the mudang's mountain pilgrimages were rare events, although improved transportation meant that by the 1990s these had become more regular occurrences in South Korea. Some mudang prepare for these pilgrimages by bathing and abstaining from eating meat, fish, or eggs. On arrival at the shrine, the pilgrim will bow and give offerings. For mudang, these mountains are places to replenish their myŏnggi and are conducive to receiving visions. Mudang will make offerings not only at the mountains but also at springs and guardian trees en route. Those reaching the mountain's summit will often add a pebble to a cairn to propitiate that mountain's sansin. Incorrectly performing the pilgrimage may upset the sansin and bring about that spirit's retribution.

Musok's most sacred mountain is Mount Paektu, located on North Korea's northern border with China; this is believed to channel ki to every other mountain in the peninsula. According to legend, it is also the birthplace of Tan'gun, the national ancestor and first mudang. Since the 1990s, mudang from South Korea have travelled to China to make pilgrimages to this mountain.

=== Talismans and divination ===
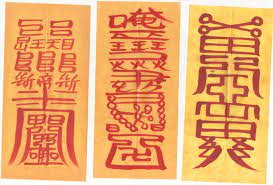
Three Korean talismans, called pujŏk or bujeok

Mudang produce talismans called pujŏk (or bujeok) which provide the bearer with good fortune. These pujŏk are often based on Hanja, Korean versions of Chinese logograms. Mudang may distribute these talismans to attendees at the end of a rite, with clients then often affixing them to the internal walls of their home.

Divination is termed jeom. One form of divination, sometimes performed during other rituals, involves a person picking one of a selection of rolled up silk flags; the color of the selected flag is then interpreted as bearing meaning for that individual. Green and yellow flags typically indicate bad fortune, while red is regarded as auspicious. The mugŏri style of divination involves casting rice and coins onto a tray, while another practice entails shaking rice kernels onto a person's lap before drawing meaning from whether they are of an odd or even number. Korean vernacular religion also incorporates ritual specialists who perform divination and create amulets but do not engage in gut rituals like the mudang.

== History ==
Musok is often perceived as being ancient, however its origins are uncertain and, according to the scholar Jung Young Lee, "almost impossible" to trace. Detailed accounts of mudang rituals prior to the modern period are rare, while the fact that the tradition is orally transmitted makes it difficult to trace historical processes.

=== Prehistory and early historic periods ===
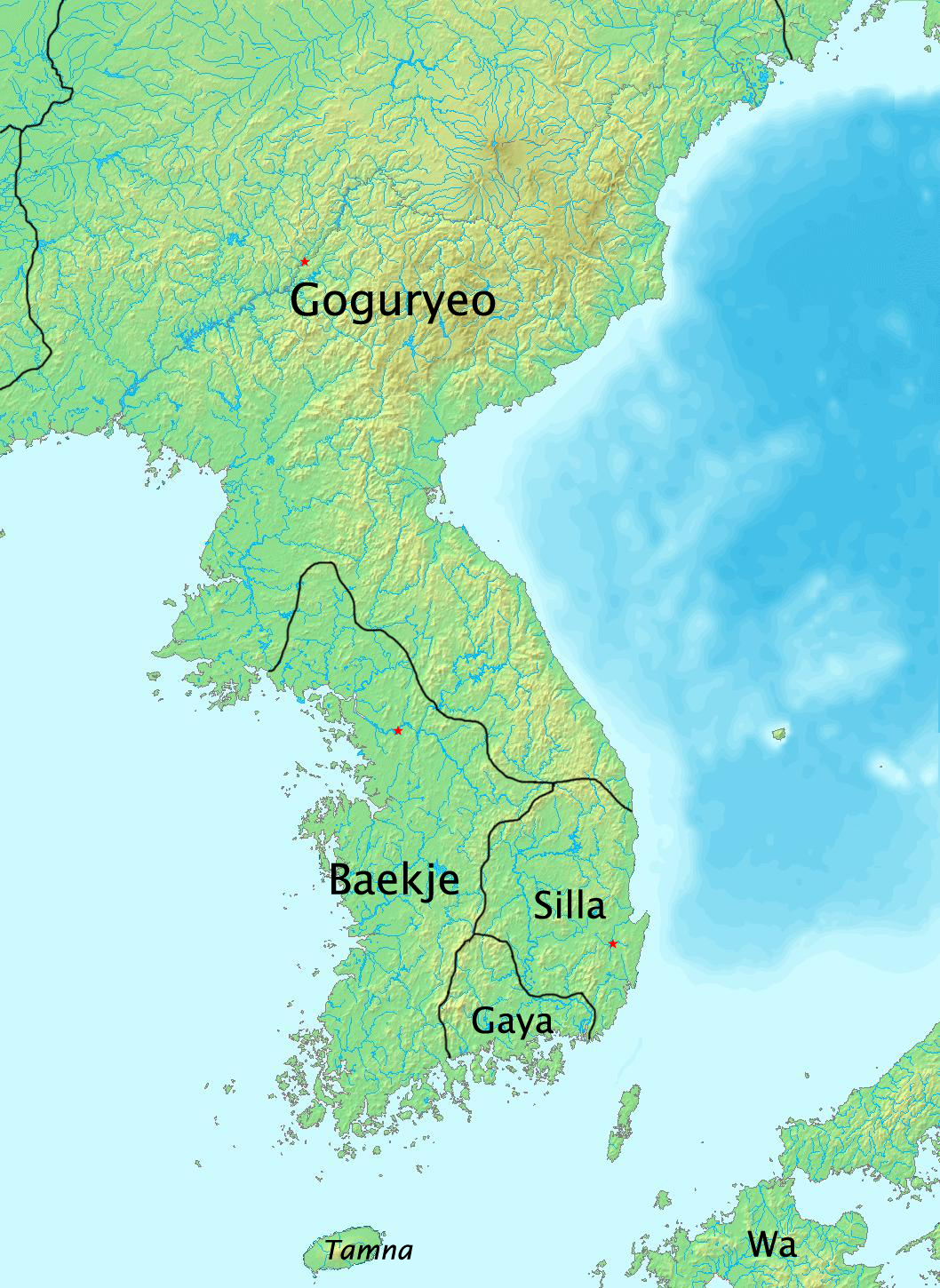
Historical references to mu appear in the 12th century, in the various Korean kingdoms

Like other Northeast Asian peoples, prehistoric Koreans had a religion that venerated spirits, animals, and celestial bodies. Surviving historical records suggest that religious activities were largely supervised by village and communal elites. McBride cautioned that using the term "shamanism" for ancient Korean religions "neither does justice to the sources nor tells us significant information about ancient Korean society and culture." Some other historians have argued that Musok has common origins with other North Asian traditions sometimes labelled "shamanic", suggesting a shared origin in prehistory.

The term mu was adopted from Chinese. In Korea, it is first recorded in the 12th-century Yisanggugjip, appearing again in the 12th-century Samguk sagi. Eleven references to the practices of mu appear in Korean historical records of the 12th and 13th centuries. Five come from the northern Korean kingdom of Koguryŏ and indicate practices like spirit mediumship, exorcism, divination, and ancestor veneration rites. Further accounts describe the presence of mu in the southern kingdoms of Paekche and Silla. These accounts reveal clear similarities with ritual specialists in northern China. The Korean term mudang only arose later. Evidence for images of the musok deities is first recorded from the 13th century. The practices of the mudang would, over time, have absorbed many elements from other traditions like Buddhism, Confucianism, and Daoism.

=== Joseon Korea ===
The Joseon dynasty (1392—1897) saw increased government persecution of the mudang. Contributing to this was the dominance of Confucian ideology, with later historians arguing that Confucian elites were challenging rivals to their power. Confucians accepted the existence of the spirits invoked in Musok rites, but argued that there were better ways of dealing with these beings. They regarded Musok rituals as improper, criticising the mingling of sexes in environments where alcohol was being consumed. Korea's Neo-Confucian scholars used the derogatory term ŭmsa for non-Confucian ceremonies, of which they considered the mudang rituals among the lowest.

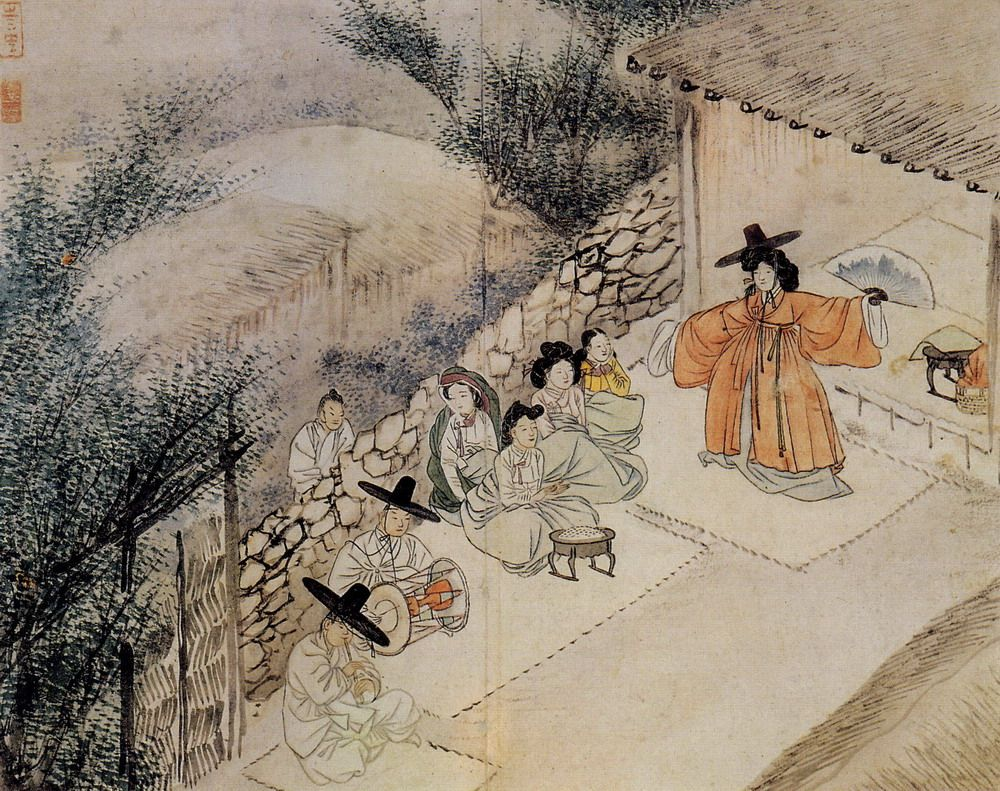
A mudang performs a gut in a painting titled Munyeo sinmu (무녀신무; 巫女神舞), made by Shin Yunbok in 1805.

In Joseon Korea, mudang belonged to one of eight outcast groups expelled from the capital city. The Gyeonggukdaejeon law book prescribed 100 lashes in public for anyone found supporting them. This persecution could prove deadly; in an extreme case, a mudang was beheaded in 1398. In an oft-cited incident, Jeju governor Yi Hyŏngsang purged the island's simbang in 1702, destroying 129 shrines. Taxes were levied on the mudang's rituals, both to discourage the practice but also to raise revenues; these taxes remained in place until the 1895 Kabo reforms. Despite persecuting the mudang, the government also turned to them in emergencies like epidemics, droughts, and famines. Several mudang were permitted access to the royal palaces, where structures were set aside for their usage.

By the late 19th century, many Korean intellectuals eager for modernisation promoted the eradication of Musok, which they increasingly labelled misin ("superstition"). Many of these intellectuals were Christian, thus regarding the mudang's spirits as evil demons; Christian missionaries generally condemned Korean vernacular religion as idol worship. Anti-Musok sentiment was endorsed in Tongnip sinmun, Korea's first exclusively Hangul newspaper, and in 1896, police launched a crackdown by arresting mudang, destroying shrines, and burning paraphernalia.

=== Japanese occupation and nationalist reimagining ===
The Empire of Japan invaded Korea in 1910. Seeking to legitimise Japanese occupation, the Japanese colonial Governor-General of Chōsen presented the mudang as evidence for Korean cultural backwardness. The Japanese initiated measures to suppress Musok, including the Mind Cultivation Movement launched in 1936. Korean elites largely supported these suppressions, partly to demonstrate Korean cultural advancement to the Japanese.

In this colonial context, scholars developed the idea that Musok was an ancient religion that represented the spiritual and cultural repository of the Korean people. Influenced by the Western use of the term "shamanism" as a cross-cultural category, some Korean scholars speculated that the mudang tradition descended from Siberian traditions. The Japanese scholar Torii Ryūzō proposed the mudang as a remnant of a primordial Shinto, with both stemming from Siberian "shamanism". These ideas were built on by nationalist Korean scholars Ch'oe Nam-sŏn and Yi Nŭnghwa in the 1920s. Cho'e reversed Torii's framework by emphasising the primacy of ancient Korean over Japanese tradition as the transmitter of Siberian religion, while Yi promoted the mudang tradition as the residue of what he called sin'gyo ("divine teachings"), meaning a primordial Korean religion that lost its purity through the arrival of Confucianism and Buddhism. At the time, Korean elites remained wary about this positive reassessment.

=== Korean War and division ===
The Korean War, division of Korea, and subsequent urbanisation resulted in many Koreans moving around the peninsula, impacting the distinct regional traditions of the mudang. Many mudang from Hwanghae (in North Korea) resettled in Inchon (in South Korea), strongly influencing Musok there, for example. This migration meant that by the early 21st century, kangsin-mu were increasingly dominant in areas like Jeju where sesŭp-mu historically predominated, generating rivalry between the two traditions.

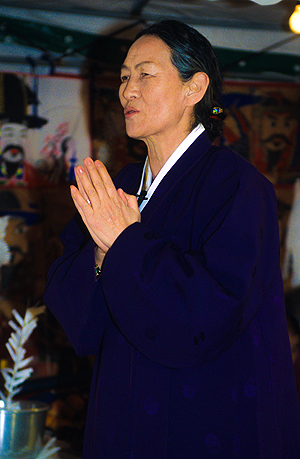
Kim Kŭm-hwa became one of the world's most famous mudang from the 1980s onward

In North Korea, most formal religious activity was suppressed, with mudang labelled part of the "hostile class". In South Korea, Christianity spread rapidly from the 1960s, becoming the country's dominant religion by the 21st century. South Korean leader Syngman Rhee launched the Sin Saenghwal Undong ("New Life Movement") which destroyed many village shrines. This policy continued as the Saemaul Undong ("New Community Movement") of his successor, Park Chung Hee, which led to a surge in the police suppression of mudang during the 1970s. In response, mudang formed the Tae Han Sŭngkong yŏngsin yŏnhap-hoe (Korean Victory Over Communism Federation of Shamans) to promote their interests, its name reflecting the anti-communist atmosphere of South Korean society.

In the 1970s, the popularization of folklore studies led to greater social acceptance among South Koreans of the idea that Musok was Korea's ancient religion. In 1962, South Korea had introduced a Cultural Properties Protection Law that recognised performing arts as intangible cultural heritage; some folklorists used this to defend the mudang. From the 1980s, South Korea's government designated certain mudang as Human Cultural Treasures. One of the best-known was Kim Kŭm-hwa, who from the 1980s performed for foreign anthropologists, toured Western countries, and appeared in documentaries. Musok rituals were increasingly revived as theatrical performances linked to cultural conservation and tourism, and Musok elements were included at the Seoul 1988 Olympic Arts Festival and President Roh Tae-woo's 1988 inauguration.

Several mudang were involved in the minjung (Popular Culture Movement) pro-democracy campaign from the 1970s, becoming emblematic of its cause. Further Musok advocacy groups appeared, often presenting the tradition as being at the heart of Korean culture. The 1980s saw mudang begin to write books about themselves, with Musok deity paintings becoming increasingly collectable in the 1980s and 1990s. From the 1990s, mudang began used the Internet to advertise their services, while portrayals of mudang became widespread on South Korean television in the 2010s. This new cultural visibility improved the mudang's social image.

== Demographics ==
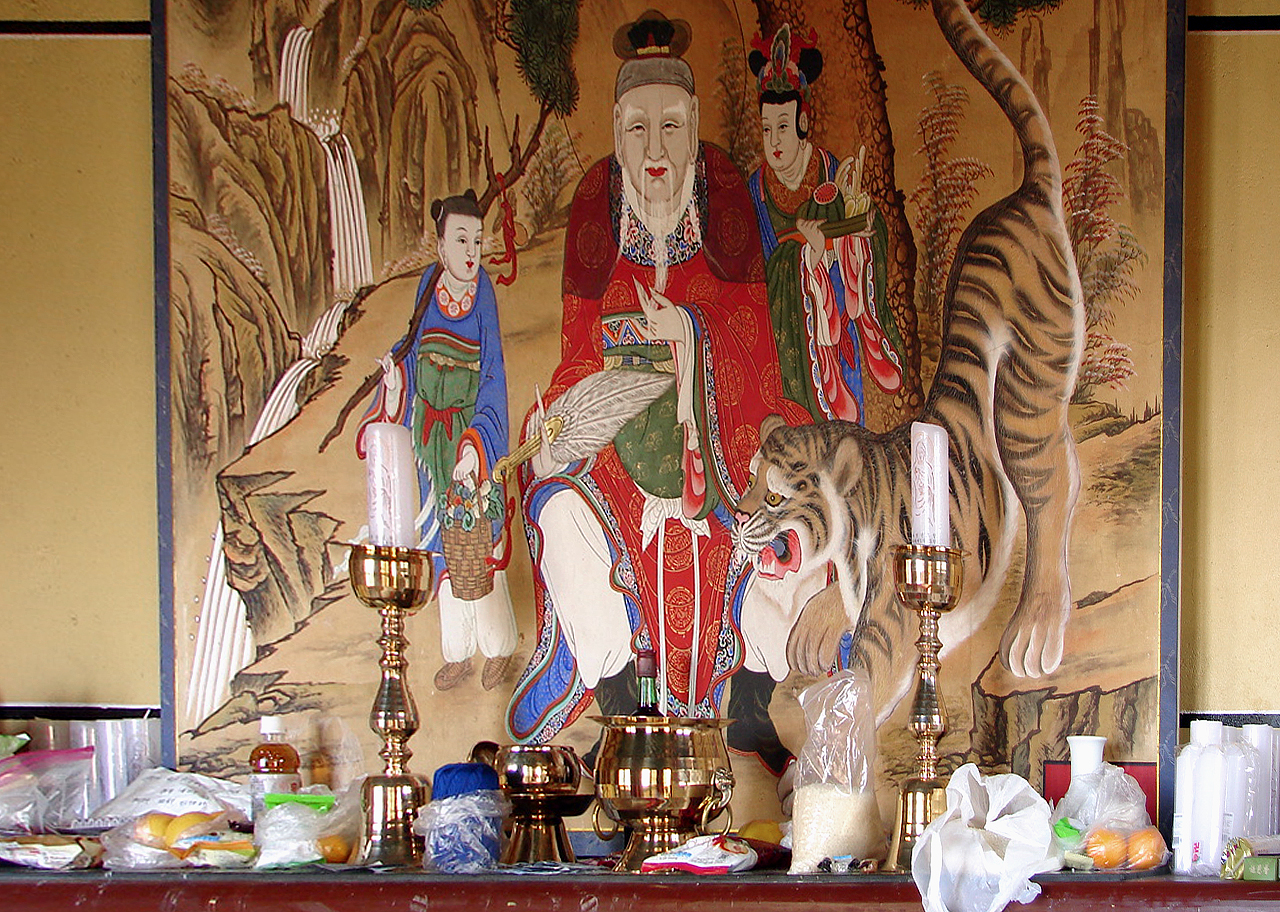
A shrine to a sansin mountain spirit inside the Buddhist temple at Saseongam in South Korea

Most mudang are female, which may relate to origin myths about musok first developing among women. Approximately a fifth of mudang are male. There is regional variation in these gender differences; on Jeju Island, there were more male than female simbang prior to the 1950s, and proportions of male practitioners remain higher there than on the Korean mainland. Mudang have conventionally belonged to the lowest social class; Chongho Kim noted that most mudang he encountered in the 1990s were poor with little formal education.

Determining the number of mudang is difficult. In 1983, around 43,000 people were members of mudang unions, while in the early 21st century, over 200,000 mudang were members of professional organisations. Rather than being evenly distributed throughout South Korea, concentrations were higher in Seoul, and on Jeju. The number of mudang as a whole does not appear to be decreasing, although the hereditary sesŭp-mu, including the Jeju simbang, are in decline. Musok is not recorded in the South Korean census because the government does not regard adherence to it as being akin to identifying as Christian or Buddhist. A late 20th-century survey by the Korean Gallup Research Institute indicated that 38 percent of South Korea's adult population had used a mudang. In North Korea, according to demographic analyses by Religious Intelligence, approximately 16 percent of the population practises "traditional ethnic" religion.

Since at least the 20th century, mudang have travelled abroad to perform rituals, for instance serving clients among Japan's Korean minority. There are also mudang in Europe, and a small number of non-Koreans have become mudang. On at least one occasion, a mudang outside Korea has promoted Musok through New Age-style workshops.

== Reception ==
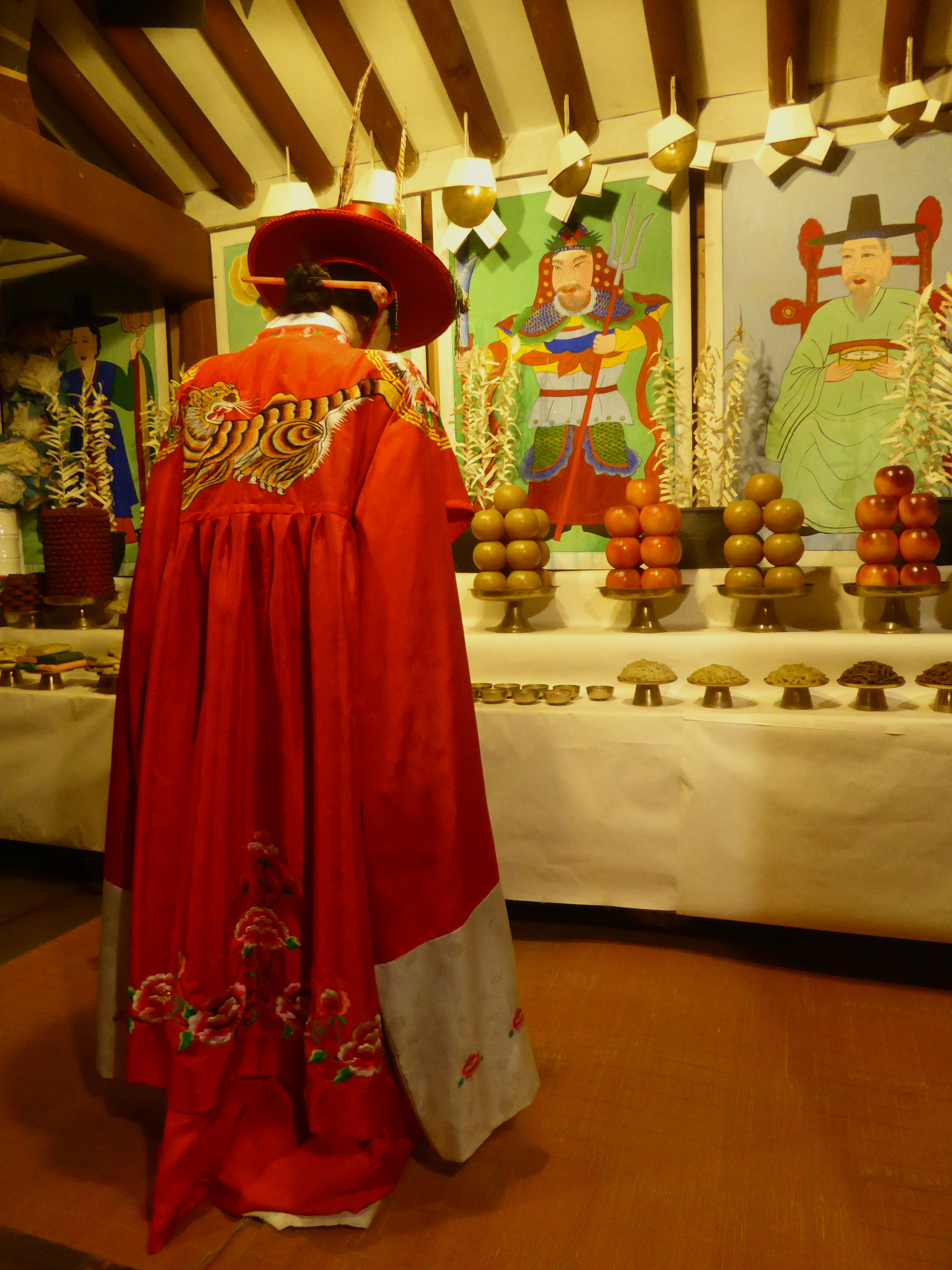
A diorama of a mudang worshipping at a shrine in the Lotte World Folk Museum, Seoul

Throughout Korean history, Musok has been suppressed by dominant ideologies including Confucianism, Japanese colonialism, and Christianity. At the start of the 21st century, the mudang remained widely stigmatized in South Korean society, albeit with signs of growing acceptance.

Often depicting mudang as swindlers, Musok's critics regularly focus on the large sums of money that the mudang charge, characterising these expenses as wasteful. Critics have also accused mudang rites of disrupting the civil order. In South Korea, a largely adversarial relationship exists between mudang and Protestants. Although some Protestants have commissioned gut, Protestantism often regards Musok as "Devil worship"; in 1890, the American Protestant missionary Horace G. Underwood defined mudang as "witch" in his English-Korean Dictionary. Mainline Protestant theologians have also blamed Musok for predisposing Koreans to Pentecostalism and the idea that prayer generates financial reward. Christians have sometimes harassed mudang at their places of work or during their ceremonies, which mudang regard as religious discrimination.

Mudang began appearing in South Korean film in the 1960s. Early portrayals in the 1960s and 1970s generally showed them as harmful and anti-modern figures, as in Ssal (1963), Munyŏdo (1972) and Iŏdo (1977). From the mid-2000s, films increasingly portrayed Musok as a living tradition operating in urban environments, as in Ch'ŏngham Posal (2009) and Paksu Kŏndal (2013). The 2000s also saw Musok feature in successful documentary films, and on Korean television. Korean artists who have cited Musok as an influence include Nam June Paik, who recreated an exorcism gut for several performances from the late 1970s. Reflecting a tendency in South Korea's government, Musok has also been presented in museums, although often with emphasis on its folkloric and aesthetic value rather than its religious function.

== See also ==
- Asian witchcraft
- Korean folklore
- Korean numismatic charm
- Korean traditional festivals
- Jongmyo jerye
- Religion in Korea
- Samgong bon-puri
- Taoism in Korea
- Chinese folk religion
- Shinto-Buddhism
