= Sillyeong =

Korean deities

- Hangul: 신령
- Hanja: 神靈
- Lit.: Divine Spirit
- RR: sillyeong
- MR: sillyŏng

Sillyeong (Korean: 신령), sometimes romanized ad-hoc sinryeong, is the general term for deities in Korean mythology and shamanism. These entities—which include nature spirits, heroes, and deified ancestors—are central to Korean shamanism and are summoned by mudang (shamans) during gut (shamanic rituals). The pantheon of sillyeong, which has changed over time, is termed sindang (신당; 神堂; lit. 'Divine Shrine'), with over 130 sillyeong having been identified.

== Description ==
Sillyeong are supernatural being possessing divine power, and are major object of worship in Korean shamanism, corresponding to the devas of Hinduism and the kami of Shinto. As can be seen from the fact that "Sansin", "Sallyeong", and "Sansillyeong" all refer to the same entity, in traditional Korean thought, "deity" and "spirit" are not separate concepts but can be combined. Korean folk religion is the worship of sillyeong.

Sillyeong are broadly divided into two types: those in which nature itself has been deified, and those in which human souls have been deified. The latter category is further subdivided into ancestral spirits, which are deified protagonists of founding myths (such as King Suro) and family ancestors, and vengeful spirits, which are the deified souls of people who died harboring resentment. Regardless of which type they belong to, In Korean shamanism, sillyeong are believed to be beings capable of causing various mysterious phenomena; they are generally invisible to the human eye but are said to occasionally appear in the form of humans or natural objects.

== See also ==
- Shen, the Chinese counterpart
- Kami, the Japanese counterpart
