= Jeju Chilmeoridang Yeongdeunggut =

Jeju Chilmeoridang Yeongdeunggut 제주 칠머리당영등굿
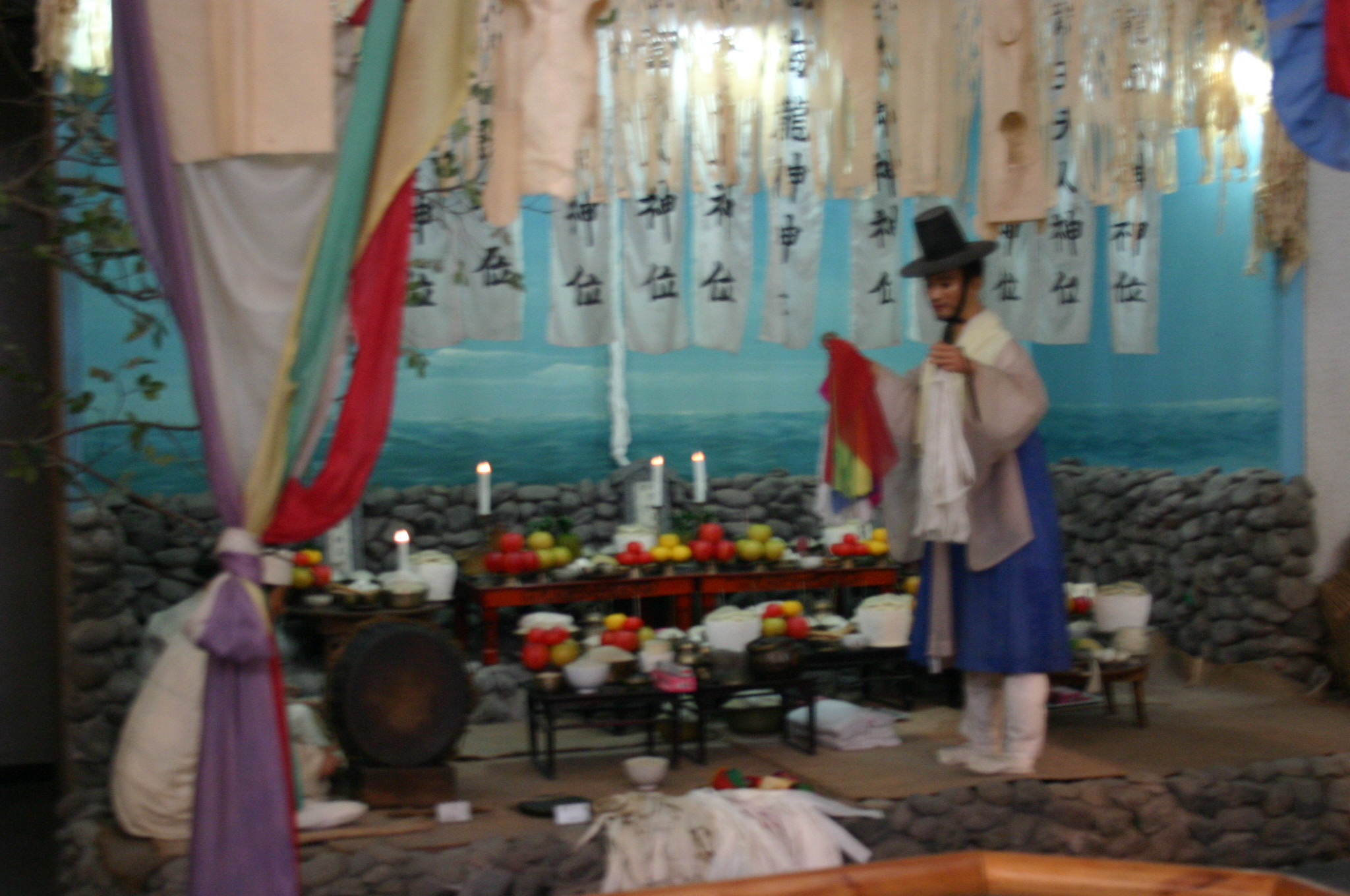
- Genre: Shaman ritual
- Begins: Korean New Year
- Frequency: Annually
- Location: Jeju Island
- Country: South Korea

Jeju Chilmeoridang Yeongdeunggut
- UNESCO Intangible Cultural Heritage
- Country: South Korea
- Reference: 00187
- Region: Asia and the Pacific

Inscription history
- Inscription: 2009 (4th session)
- List: Representative

Jeju Chilmeoridang Yeongdeunggut (Korean: 제주 칠머리당영등굿) is a shaman ritual that is held on Jeju Island, South Korea at the start of the Korean New Year. The people of Jeju, especially those in the Gwideok, Geumnyeong, and Aewol areas put up 12 posts in the shape of horse heads and colorful silk fabrics to cheer up the goddess Yeongdeung Halmang, who is believed to have visited their place in Korean shamanism. The gut is led by a male dukun until the 15th. At night, lanterns (yeondeung) are installed on the two posts, so this ritual is also called yeondeungje or lantern festival. During the day, the horse carved into the stake looks like a galloping horse, so the gut is also known as yakma bui or galloping horse game.

Now, this gut is very rare because the shaman who practices it is rare. This celebration is protected as an Important Intangible Cultural Properties of Korea. Furthermore, in 2009, Jeju Chilmeoridang yeondeunggut was inscribed on the UNESCO Intangible Cultural Heritage Lists.
