= Yeongdeung Halmang =

Korean goddess of wind and seas

- Goddess of Wind and Sea
- Hangul: 영등할망
- Abode: Sky
- Gender: Female
- Region: Jeju Island
- Ethnic group: Jejuans
- Festivals: Yeongdeunggut

Yeongdeung Halmang (Korean: 영등할망) was a goddess of the winds and the sea in traditional Korean religion, particularly on Jeju Island.

According to legend, the goddess resided in the Sky, but visited the island once a year, and sowed the foods of the sea, such as fish, seashells and other things which the inhabitants of the island lived of, and rituals were held to ask her to be generous.
