= Josang =

Korean term for immediate ancestors

Josang refers to one's immediate ancestors, offspring, a deceased relative or any unrelated soul; and worshipped as a god in Korean Shamanism. It is viewed as a supernatural being rather than blood relations, includes all immediate and extended family, both male and female, and all other deceased souls that influence the family. These include who died before marriage, or who died a tragic, untimely death.

Josang plays a central role in shamanic belief and is related to the lives of the living. The rituals carried out for Josang as a household god is different from shamanic practices and Confucian rituals. In Shamanism, according to a widespread belief, lack of devotion in worshipping Josang results in trouble for the descendants.

== History ==
The ancestor's spirit acts as a protector against evil according to a prevalent notion among several religions. Scholars argue that formalized ancestor worship dates back to the reign of the King of Silla during the time of the Three Kingdoms. It was initially limited only to the royal families. These rituals conducted four times a year, followed the change of seasons. It was only at the end of the Koryo dynasty and the beginning of the Yi dynasty (15th century) that ancestor worship took a definitive form. The emergence of Confucianism as the dominant ideology for the Yi dynasty led to the popularization of ancestor worship among Korean families. This included the establishment of a shrine based on family lineage in each household. Although Buddhism was the official religion, ancestor worship, including the three-year mourning ritual, was practised.

== Worship procedure ==
During the funerary rites, the rite of calling back the departing spirit certifies the death. The spirit in the spirit box leaves the preserved dead body after death. One more spirit goes with the messengers from the other-world, and the third spirit remains in the body with the seven souls. The funerary rites and the ceremony for the messengers performed with the corpse and spirit box are due to this reason. The most important rite of the funeral is the rite of purification of the corpse. In this rite, food and clothes are given to the dead for life in the afterworld; during the rite of separation after binding the corpse, relatives, and friends give paper money to the deceased to use at the twelve gates in the otherworld.

The long period of funeral and mourning is a period of patience and self-denial for the mourner. This sacrifice of the offspring allows the deceased parent to become an ancestor who must also then protect the living family members. The dead spirit needs the help of a shaman to release it from regret and to help in the passing of the ten trials in the otherworld. This is done when the death is due to an accident. There are three types of shamanistic relief rituals, namely the ritual for house cleansing (chipkasim), the ritual for requiem (chinogi-kut), and the ritual of purification (ssigim- gut). The rituals of requiem and purification are the most popular and important of these.

The main purpose of the ritual of house cleansing is to dissipate the regret of the dead. In the course of this ritual the spirit comes down twice, once to the shaman, and once to the man holding the bamboo stick. As in the funeral rite, the important deities in this ritual are messengers who guide the deceased to the king of the otherworld. The ritual of requiem (chinogi-kut) eases the passing of the deceased to heaven and to help it reach paradise after passing the ten judgements by the underworld kings. The most important deity in this ritual is Princess Pari, the shaman's foundress-spirit.

The most symbolic part of the ritual of requiem is the rite for cutting the cloth bridges. But the ritual of purification has vivid symbolic sections-the rite for unfastening the seven knots, the rite of washing the dead body with water, and the rite of a smooth passage. They symbolize the dissipation of regret, purification from pollution and the passageway to the otherworld. These shamanistic rituals allow those who died in accidents to be purified and pass to the otherworld.

== Ancestor worship in modern Korea ==
The advent of modernization in Korea brought with it the expectation that there would be a decline in the prevalence of ancestral sacrifice. Son, in his essay, “Ancestor Worship: From the Perspective of Modernization”, lists five factors which indicate that ancestor worship in Korea will not be revived strongly; the weakened status of Confucianism, secularization of the traditional world view, disintegration of traditional family and social structures, sense of estrangement toward the rites and Christian influence on society.

Numerous families making regular visits to their ancestral graves and performing many rites associated with their ancestors. Koreans who still practice ancestor worship observe these rites every January 1 (Seollal) and August 15 (Chuseok, of the lunar calendar). They visit ancestral homes and tombs and on Hansik Day in March, and offer sacrificial food at the ancestral tomb. Korean Christianity to cope with ancestor worship, instituted the memorial service as an alternative. The Korean Church transformed ancestor worship into a “Koreanised” memorial service which served the indigenous culture. However, Kim points out that it still has the shamanistic ritual elements reminiscent of ancestor worship: In today's Christian memorial ritual, elements of Confucian worship have been intermingled. For example, they look to the picture of the deceased, make a bow, burn candles and put them in front of the grave which is a Confucian ritual.
