= Dongti =

Korean mythology term

Dongti (Korean: 동티), also known as Dongto (동토; 動土) or Shinbeol (신벌; 神罰; literally Punishment of the Gods) is the term for Divine punishment in Korean mythology.

== Causes ==
Dongti are said to be caused by shamanistic deities, including village patrons. For example, in one myth, a man used Jangseung, or totem poles, for fuel, foolishly believing that the Jangseung would not avenge him. Because the man received the rage of the Jangseung, or Dongti, he quickly died from an assortment of deadly diseases. Similar myths tell of how people who toppled the village altars, the Seonangdang, suddenly fell sick and died due to Dongti caused by the village patrons, the Seonangshin. There are also myths about the holy trees, the Shinmok or Dangsu Namu, causing fatal disease.

The Gashin, or household deities, can also cause Dongti. When the objects the Gashin embody (such as the Seongju Hangari of the Seongjushin, Cheollyung Hangari of the Cheollyungshin, Jowang Geurut of the Jowangshin, Jeseok Ogari and Mom Ogari of the ancestor gods) are shattered, when the animals (generally toads, weasels, or rat snakes) that the goddess Eobshin embodies are killed, or when someone digs on the earth that Teojushin embodies without an appeasing ritual, the person who is blasphemous gets Dongti, mostly by disease and/or great misfortune. The goddess of the pit toilet, Cheukshin, is one of the best-known causers of Dongti; when her long hair touches a human who has not coughed thrice before entering the Outhouse, the human gets an incurable sickness and dies. This is a reference to many pathogens spreading via feces.

Gwishin, or evil spirits, are also said to cause Dongti when the protection of the village or household patrons falter.

Most of the disease described as Dongti were probably just normal disease strengthened by the Nocebo effect.

== Prevention and cure ==
To prevent Dongti, Koreans used astrology to avoid encountering Dongti-causing Gwishin while making a grave or logging; the location of the Gwishin was able to be predicted because they followed the stars in a daily pattern.

In important events, such as making a grave, Koreans held rites for the Sanshin, the mountain spirits (as the graves are set in mountains) and Teojushin, the earth deity (as the coffin and the body are set under the earth), as to prevent their anger, likely to result in Dongti. To this day, in important events, many Koreans pray to the Obang Shinjang (directional deities), in part to avoid Dongti.

Once a Dongti occurs and has been identified by a shaman as such, there were two solutions, differing on whether the causer was an evil entity (such as Gwishin) or powerful deity (such as Jowangshin or Seonangshin).

In the latter, Koreans held large Gut to appease the deity who caused the Dongti. The Placebo effect caused by the Gut may have had some influence on the condition of the patient, but there were many times when the patient died. Shamans explained this through the image of vengeful deities, such as Cheukshin.

In the former, a blind shaman recited the Dongtogyeong, a spell which was said to kill or drive away the Gwishin. In the Dongtogyeong, Gwishin that cause Dongti are called 'Dongtoshin', meaning 'God of Dongti'; further information is nonexistent.
