= Nulgupjisin =

Deity in Jeju Island shamanism

Nulgubjisin (Korean: 눌굽지신, Korean pronunciation: [nuɭ.kub.dʑi.sʰin]), also known as Nadgarishin (낟가리신, Korean pronunciation: [nat.ga.ɾi.ɕin]) is the deity of Nulgub, an area where grain is stored and ground into flour, in Korean mythology, as well as being the deity of grain. He is considered the weakest of the Gashin, the household deities of Korean mythology. There is thus no gut (shamanistic ritual) nor bonpuri (narrative) dedicated to Nulgubjisin.

This household god is specific to Jeju.

== Rite ==
The rite dedicated to Nulgubjisin was a short one. In the Gakdobinyeom Ritual, where shamans prayed to all of the Gashin, shamans put food inside a jug and went to the Nulgub. The shaman then prayed to Nulgubjisin to ensure a good grain harvest and the protection of the family from misfortune or Gwishin (evil ghosts). The shaman then placed the food that he brought on the Nulgub with a spoon.

Because he was considered to be the weakest of the Gashin, the rite dedicated to Nulgubjisin was the last rite in the Gakdobinyeom Ritual (First: Munjeonshin, the door god, Second: Chilseongshin, the storage goddess, Third: Jowangshin, the kitchen goddess, Fourth: Obang Shinjang, the directional deities, Fifth: Jumok Jeongsal Jishin, god of the door-like Jeongnang, Sixth: Nulgubjisin, god of grain) There is no myth or story of its shape, about Nulgubjisin.

== See also ==
- Gashin cult, the Korean worship and veneration of household deities
