= Doorway worship =

Doorway worship refers to a ritual of worship at the entrance of a home, company, or institution, where various types of Ghosts and Gods can be, it is prominent in East Asian culture. It can involve giving offerings such as wine, or Soft drinks. It is a prominent element of Taiwanese folk beliefs.

It can also be a festival where incense is set up at the entrance to worship the spirits passing through the area during the local welcome tournament or Miaohui.

Among the daily rituals of Taiwanese folk beliefs, "doorway worship" is very common, and varies considerably by ethnic group. Minnan people often perform door worship for Tudigong, the foundation owner, and Goryō, while Hakka people also worship Goryō, but not all Goryō, but Goryō who have died in this community and have no descendants to worship them.

== See also ==
- Liminal deities such as the Menshen (門神)/Munsin (문신) door-gods or Janus
- Door Guardians such as Dvarapala and Lamassu
- Ceremonial Gates such as Torii (鳥居), Mon (門), Paifang (牌坊), Triumphal arches, or Holy doors
- Door rituals and ritual items such as Bagua mirrors (八卦镜子), Mezuzah, Church or Home holy water fonts, Chalking the door, and the carving of Witch Marks on doors
- Liminal temples and shrines such as Taiwanese Yin Miao (陰廟), South-east Asian Spirit houses, shrines for TuDi Gong (土地公), NaTuk Kong (拿督公)/Datuk Keramat (拿督科拉邁), or Korean Jangseung (장승)/Sotdae (솟대) poles, or the placing of TaiShan ShiGanDang (泰山石敢當) Tablets
