= Liminal deity =

Gods of boundaries or transitions

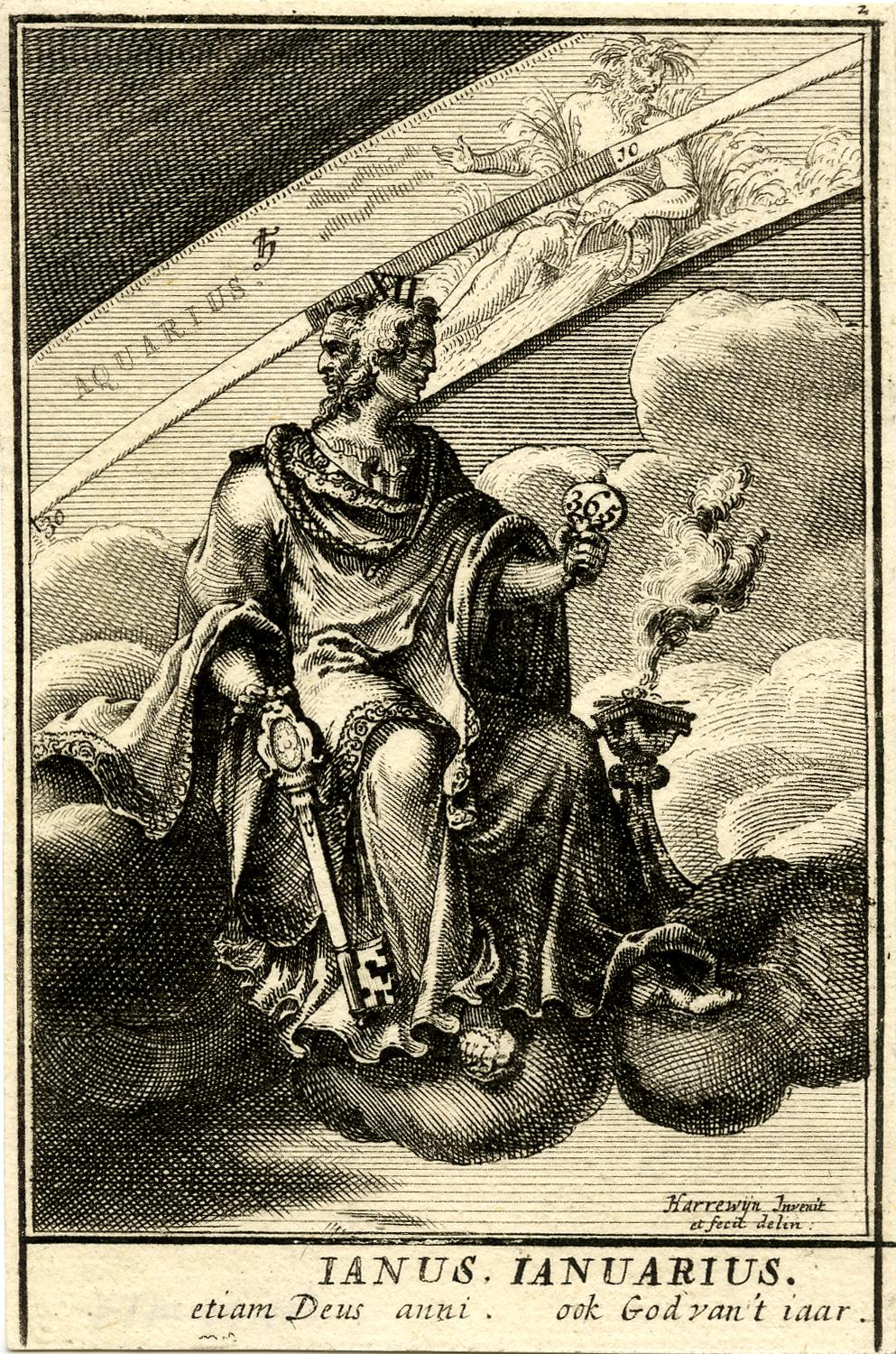
Janus was believed to see over times of change, such as the New Year and the beginning of the day.

A liminal deity is a deity in mythology who presides over thresholds, gates, or doorways; "a crosser of boundaries". In Hindu traditions, liminal deities are also associated with tirthas, or holy crossing places, which function as spiritual thresholds in physical geography. These sites—often river fords, pilgrimage crossings, or transitional boundary zones—are linked to multiple gods and serve as sacred locations where the earthly and divine realms intersect. These gods are believed to oversee a state of transition of some kind; such as, the old to the new, the unconscious to the conscious state, the familiar to the unknown.

Types of liminal deities include dying-and-rising deities, various agricultural deities, psychopomps and those who descend into the underworld: crossing the threshold between life and death. Vegetation deities mimic the annual dying and returning of plant life, making them seasonally cyclical liminal deities in contrast to the one-time journey typical of the dying-and-rising myth. Anthropologist Victor Turner expanded the modern theoretical understanding of liminality by emphasizing the role of shamans, guides, and ritual specialists who facilitate transitions between states of being. These ritual figures occupy liminal positions themselves and mirror mythological deities who guide individuals across cosmic or social thresholds.

== Etymology ==
The word liminal, first attested to in English in 1884, comes from the Latin word limen, meaning 'threshold'. Liminality is a term given currency in the twentieth century by British cultural anthropologist Victor Turner. It is used to describe a state of transition; such as from the old to the new, from the familiar to the unknown, even from an unconscious to the conscious state.

== Functions and roles ==
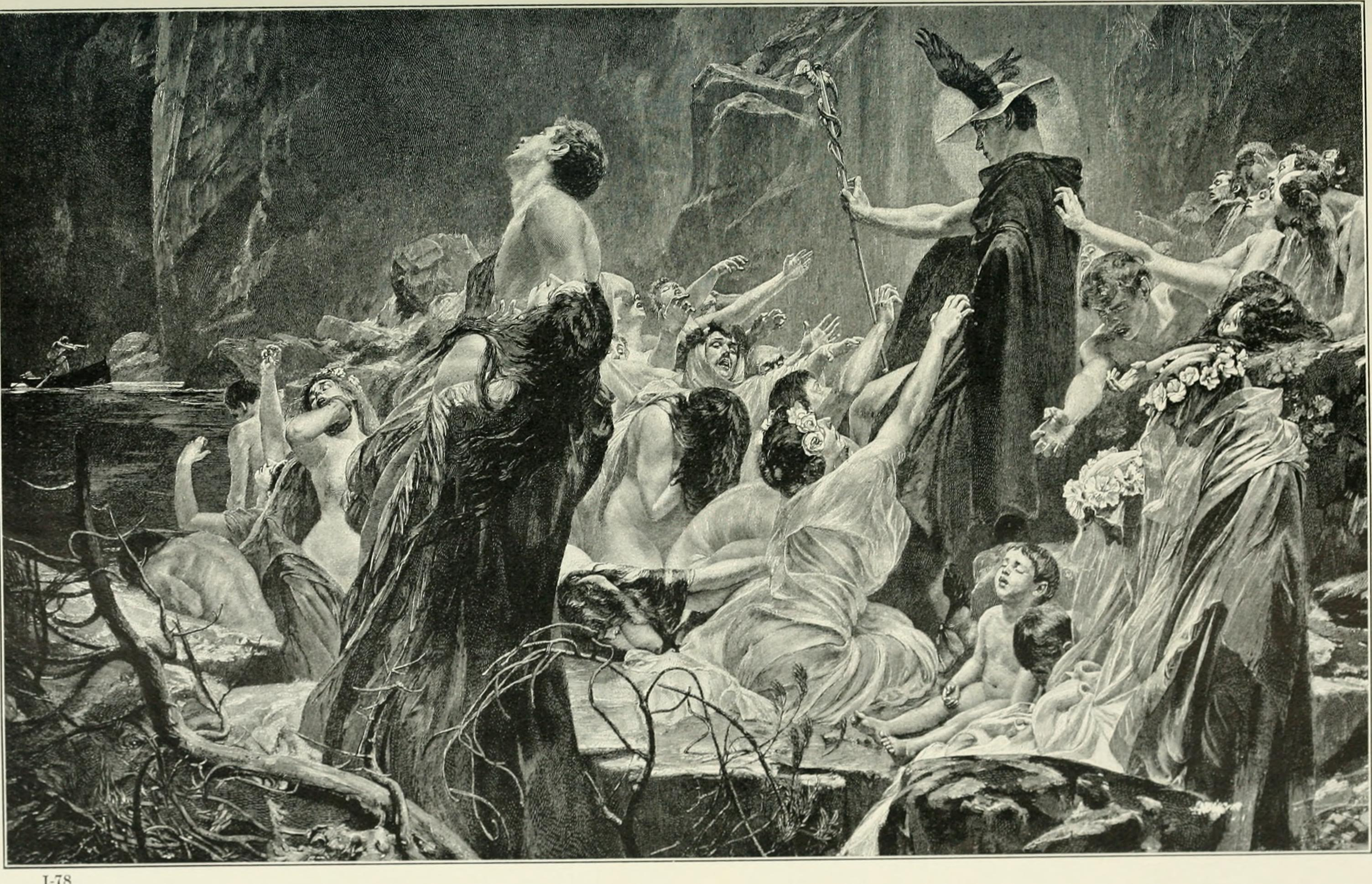
A depiction of Hermes as a psychopomp

Most liminal deities usually travel or cross the boundaries of all worlds, including the physical, metaphysical and even conceptual. They can act as psychopomps or as gatekeepers. For example, the Greek messenger god Hermes was known to be a psychopomp acting as a guide for dead souls to the underworld, as was the goddess Hecate. Some liminal deities even embody the concept of liminality or rites of passage. For example, the Roman two-faced god Janus was known to embody the concept of duality and transitions, such as the beginning and ending of the new year. Their role is not always to interact or cross the boundaries of cosmos, but also to keep limits to them or everything else so there can be a balance between the worlds. Some liminal deities also function as spiritual guardians of boundaries, crossroads and other liminal spaces such as village boundaries, doorways, cremation grounds and life passages..

== List of liminal deities ==
=== African religions ===
- Eshu, orisha of trickery, crossroads, doors, messengers and chaos in the Yoruba religion.
- Anubis, Ancient Egyptian god of death and funerary rites who was known for guiding the souls to the afterlife as well as transporting them there.
- Osiris, Ancient Egyptian god of the afterlife whose resurrection became associated with the cycles in nature, in particular the sprouting of vegetation and the annual flooding of the Nile River.
- Legba, phallic crossroad spirit and trickster in West African Vodun and Haitian Vodou. He is the bringer of magic, master diviner and speaker of every language who facilitates communication between man and the gods. Legba is also the remover of obstacles and the guardian of the home and crossroads.

=== Afro-American religions ===
- Elegua (Eshu/Exu in Candomblé), the messenger god and psychopomp in Santería, and Candomblé.

=== Asian religions ===
==== Ainu mythology ====
- Apasam Kamuy, deity of the threshold conceived as either dual or a couple who is one entity

==== Buddhism ====
- Kṣitigarbha, the bodhisattva who acted as a psychopomp.

==== Chinese mythology ====
- Cheng'huang, the gods of walls and moats. Every major city had a City God appointed by the imperial government
- Menshen, the gods of doors and gates known for protection against evil influences.
- Chen Wenlong, god of city walls in Fuzhou
- Fan Zeng, god of city walls in Hezhou and He country.
- Guan Ying, god of city walls in Longxing, Gan, Yuan, Jiang, Ji, Jiang, Jianchang, Linjiang, Nanchang and Nankang.
- Huang Xie, god of city walls in Suzhou.
- Huo Gang, Yu Bo, and Chen Huangcheng, gods of city walls in Shanghai.
- Ji Shun, god of city walls in Zhengzhou, Zhenjiang, Qingyuan, Ningguo, Taiping, Xiangyang, Xingyuan, Fuzhou, Nanan and Huating.
- Jian Yi

==== Filipino mythology ====
- Makiubaya: the Ifugao divinities who watch over the gates of the village
- Manduyapit: the Manobo god who ferries departed souls across the red river before going to the afterworld

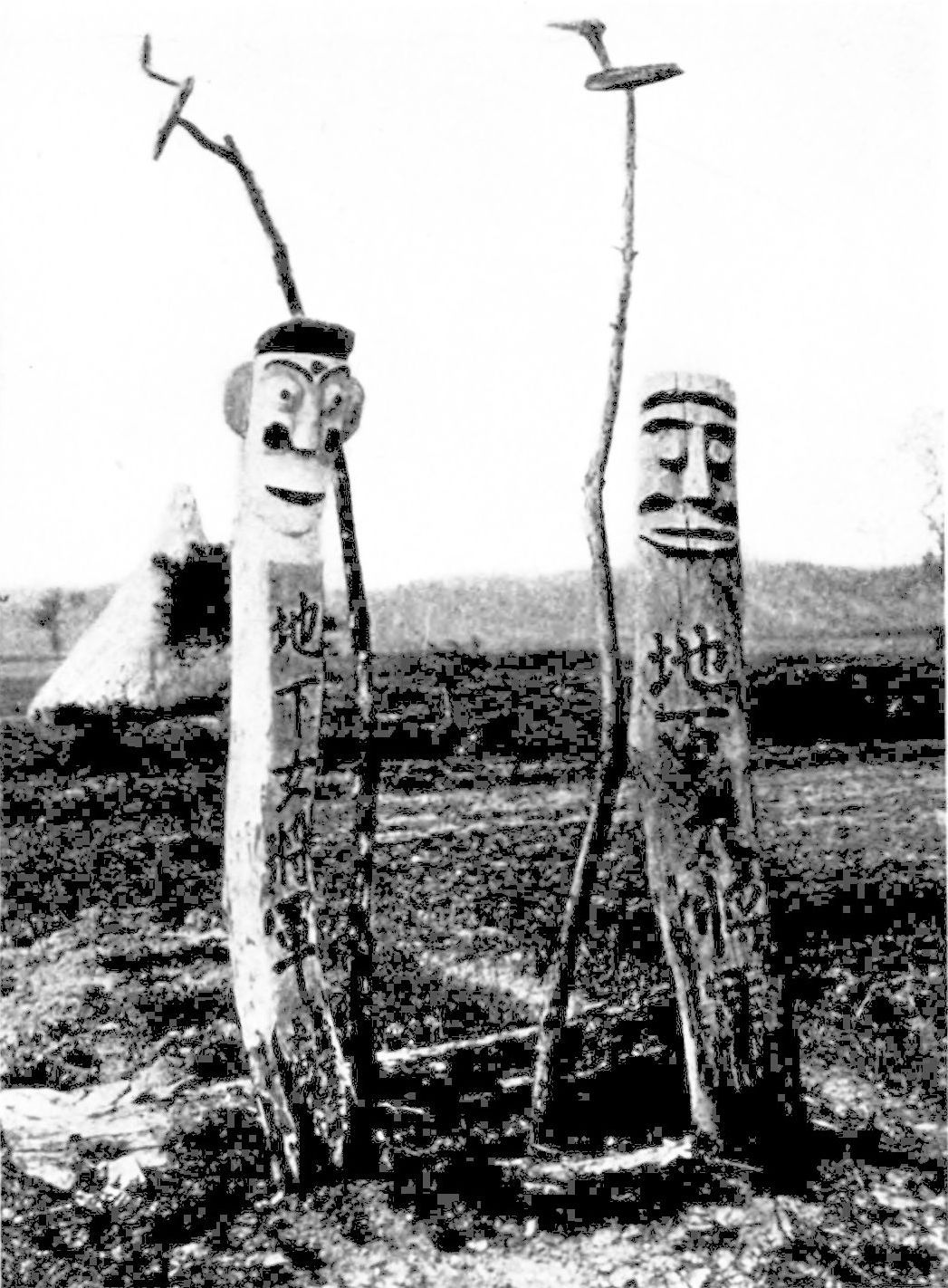
Jangseung are traditionally placed at the boundaries of villages.

==== Hinduism ====
- Agni, god of fire and messenger between gods and mortals, Ganesha seems to have at least partially taken over this role in modern Hinduism
- Ganesha, The god of beginnings. Referred to as the 'Indian Janus' by 18th-century scholar William Jones.
- Narada, is a sage-divinity, famous in Hindu traditions as a travelling musician and storyteller, who carries news and enlightening wisdom. Being the universal divine messenger, is the primary source of information among gods and is considered the first journalist on Earth.
- Narasimha, presider over the threshold between interior and exterior.
- Matrikas, seven or eight goddess group worshipped at crossroads.
- Pushan, solar deity and psychopomp responsible for marriages, journeys, roads, the feeding of cattle, and overseeing the journey of the dead to the afterlife.

==== Korean mythology ====
- Jangseung, a totem pole traditionally placed at the edges of villages to mark for village boundaries and frighten away demons; also worshipped as tutelary deities
- Munsin, Korean deity of the door. He was considered one of the most powerful of the house gods (Gashin), especially in Jeju Island

==== Mesopotamian mythology ====
- Dumuzi/Tammuz
- Inanna/Ishtar

==== Phrygian mythology ====
- Attis, Phrygian vegetation deity; his self-mutilation, death, and resurrection represents the fruits of the earth, which die in winter only to rise again in the spring.

==== Shinto ====
- Dosojin, road ancestor gods who are considered the shinto gods of boundaries, marriage, fertility and health
- Izanagi, creator god who descended into Yomi to bring back his wife, only to be repulsed at how hideous she had become, run away, and seal the entrance to Yomi with a rock
- Izanami, creator goddess who died, but could not leave Yomi and thus became queen of the underworld and the dead

==== Vietnamese mythology ====
- Thành hoàng, the gods that bless and protect villages or larger areas
- Môn thần, the gods of doors

=== European religions ===
==== Baltic mythology ====
- Užsparinė, Lithuanian goddess of land borders

==== Etruscan mythology ====
- Culsans, a male deity with two faces, possibly a protector of gateways. Usually equated with the Roman god Janus.

==== Greek mythology ====
- Adonis, god of beauty and desire who spent part of his time in the underworld, and part on earth before his tragic death
- Alexiares and Anicetus
- Charon, a psychopomp believed to ferry souls between the worlds of the living and the dead
- Cerberus, a multi-headed dog that guards the gates of the Underworld to prevent the dead from leaving
- Dionysus, who in one myth is torn apart by Titans, but brought back to life
- Enodia, goddess of crossroads
- Hecate, goddess of magic, ghosts and crossroads.
- Heracles, who was worshipped both as a deceased hero and an Olympian god.
- Hermes, god of roads, merchants, travelers, trade, thievery/thieves, cunning, and animal husbandry; messenger of Zeus and psychopomp
- Persephone, often seen as a goddess of spring and new growth was believed to spend part of her time in the underworld, and part on earth

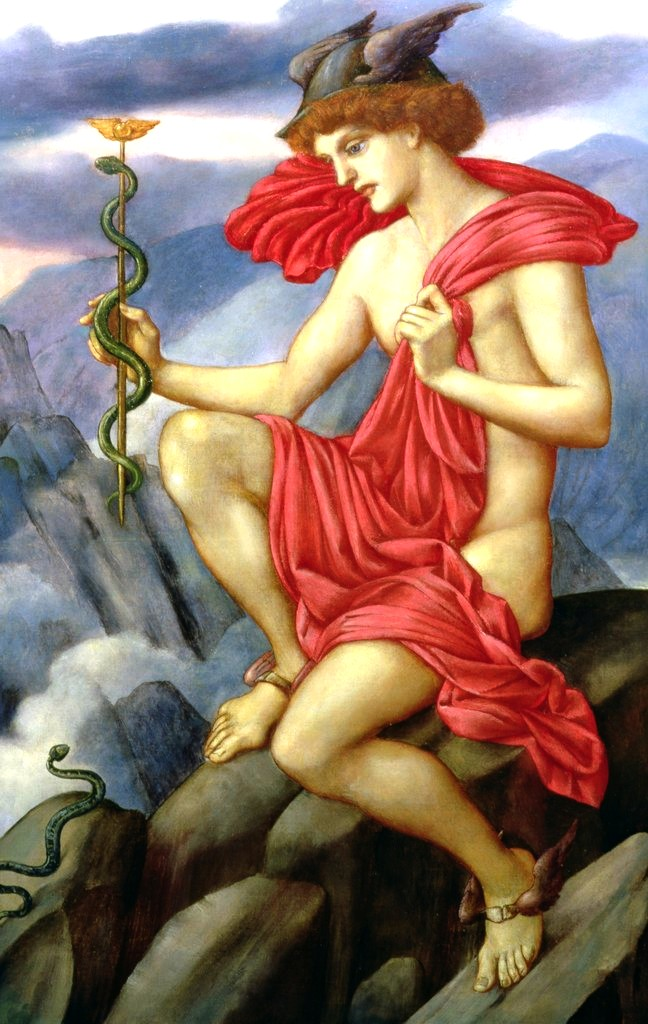
Mercury was a god of travellers, like his Greek equivalent Hermes.

==== Roman mythology ====
- Bacchus, Roman name for Dionysus
- Cardea, goddess of health, thresholds, and door hinges and handles
- Diana, as Diana Trivia she serves as the goddess of three-way crossroads and the underworld; often equated with the Greek Hecate
- Forculus, Lima, and Limentinus, minor deities of thresholds or doorways; see indigitamenta
- Hercules, originally a demigod through post his apotheosis ascended from the underworld to Mount Olympus living with the gods as gatekeeper of Olympus.
- Janus, dual-faced god of gates, doors, doorways, beginnings and endings, for whom January is named.
- Mercury, messenger god and psychopomp; equivalent to the Greek Hermes and shares several of his functions, such as being a god of commerce, travelers, merchants, and thieves
- Portunus, god of keys, doors, and livestock
- Proserpina, Roman equivalent of Persephone who spent some of her time living in the world of the dead
- Terminus, god who protected boundary markers and other liminal spaces.

==== Norse mythology ====
- Gná, Frigg's personal messenger; she rode the horse Hofvarpnir who could travel over both sea and sky
- Heimdall, son of Odin; he keeps watch for invaders and the onset of Ragnarök from his dwelling Himinbjörg, where the burning rainbow bridge Bifröst meets the sky
- Hermóðr, messenger of the Norse gods; he rode to Hel to plead for Baldr's return, ultimately being unsuccessful
- Odin, god of war and death, among other things; he is described as at least once visiting the underworld on Sleipnir, raising a völva to interrogate, and visiting jotunn on three occasions in their domain in order to gather more wisdom

=== Middle Eastern religions ===
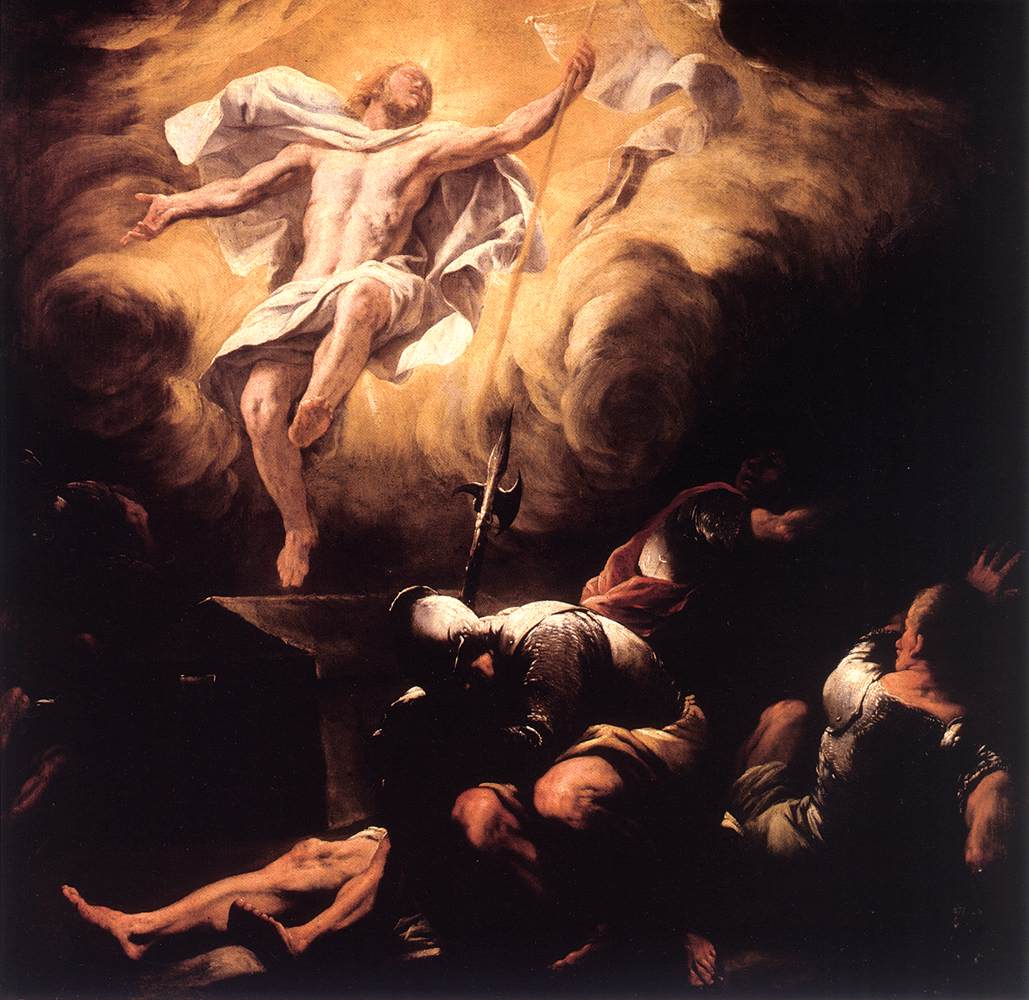
Christians believe Jesus crossed the boundary from the afterlife to earth during his resurrection.

- Jesus Christ is presented as a crosser of borders. The Resurrection of Jesus describes his dying and rising.

== See also ==
- Gate guardian – Symbolic guardian at a military facility
- Household deity – Deity or spirit associated with the home
- Liminal being – Quality of ambiguity, disorientation, or state of transition
