= Munjeon bon-puri =

Korean shamanic myth of Jeju Island

- Hangul: 문전본풀이
- Hanja: 門前本풀이
- Revised Romanization: Munjeon-bonpuri
- McCune–Reischauer: Munjŏn-bonp'uri

The Munjeon Bonpuri (Korean: 문전본풀이), meaning 'Annals of the Door', 'Book of the Door', 'Narration of the Door' or 'Explanation of the Door', is a myth of Jeju Island regarding Gasin, or deities that are believed to reside within the house.

== Synopsis ==
In the village of Namseon in the kingdom of Junyeon lived Namseonbi and his wife, Yeosan Buin. Yeosan Buin was a very capable wife who raised the money for the family. However, her husband Namseonbi wasted all of the money whenever Yeosan Buin gathered enough.

The family of Yeosan Buin had nine members: Namseonbi, Yeosan Buin, and their seven sons. The name of the seventh was Nokdisaengin.

The family was frequently hungry, as a result of their poverty. Yeosan Buin was worried by their pitiful condition, and bought fine cotton clothes and hats and fifty silver coins by selling her treasures she had brought from her family. She suggested that with these accessories, they buy grain, which was cheap in their village, and sell it in other villages, where grain was expensive.

Namseonbi thus set out to another village in the village of Odong in the Kingdom of Odong. There, Namseonbi, dressed in expensive clothing and controlling a ship full of grain, looked as if he was a wealthy man.

Noiljadae, the daughter of a jumak owner, approached Namseonbi and suggested that he rest in their jumak. There, Namseonbi sold all of his clothes and grains for rice wine and games. Once Namseonbi again fell in poverty, Noiljadae chased him away. Namseonbi was forced to build a hut out of rice stalks, with a door made of rotten wood. Noiljadae fed him harsh grain in a dog's tray and because of the harsh grain, Namseonbi went blind.

Meanwhile, Yeosan Buin became worried about Namseonbi's absence and built a small wooden boat. She then sailed to the village of Odong.

Once there, Yeosan Buin overheard a girl singing a song to chase sparrows away from the grain fields. The lyrics were about Namseonbi being tricked by Noiljadae's wit and then being chased away to a hut. She used this to track down Namseonbi.

Namseonbi was blind and could not recognize his wife. However, when Namseonbi tasted the food that Yeosan Buin prepared, he recognised Yeosan Buin. Yeosan Buin began preparations to sail home.

Noiljadae learned of this and decided she needed to get rid of Yeosan Buin. She invited Yeosan Buin to wash in the lake of Ocheongang. Ocheongang was an icy lake that had no bottom. Knowing this, Noiljadae did not go in, but Yeosan Buin did and drowned.

Noiljadae then pretended to be Yeosan Buin, and went to the village of Namseon with Namseonbi. Because of her first encounter with Namseonbi, she believed the family was rich.

Six of the seven sons dropped their things to greet their parents, but Nokdisaengin knew that the woman was not truly his mother, as Noiljadae did not share her umbrella with Namseonbi and her appearances and voice were different. She tried to explain the differences using various excuses, but only the six other sons were fooled.

Noiljadae decided to kill Nokdisaengin. She pretended to be sick and said that there was a famous prophet called Jangjeol Doryeong in Jajeot Street who could help. Namseonbi went to find him, and she ran to Jajeot Street and told him using a different voice that the cure would be to feed her the liver of Nokdisaengin.

But Namseonbi refused. So Noiljadae performed the same trick two more times, pretending that she was a doctor and a Jangseung. Namseonbi was finally convinced and sharpened his knife to kill Nokdisaengin. However, Nokdisaengin had a plan and told his parens that he would commit suicide instead. In a nearby mountain, Nokdisaengin gathered his brothers and killed a young boar. He told them that if their "mother" was cured after eating the boar liver, when she was not actually their mother.

The brothers fed the boar liver to Noiljadae. She claimed to be miraculously cured, then tried to kill the sixth son. The six other brothers, led by the youngest Nokdisaengin, ambushed her to stop her. Caught guilty in the act, she hanged herself in the bathroom.

The brothers then went to the village of Odong and prayed to the supreme deity Cheonjiwang for four days and nights for their mother back. The cadaver of Yeosan Buin was revealed but there were only bones left.

Four days later, Nokdisaengin met a crane that told him that it could fly to the fields of Seocheon, where flowers that could revive the body were grown. The crane promised to take Nodisaengin, the smallest and lightest of the brothers, on its back, if the brothers caught it seven carps to eat.

Each of the brothers caught a carp, except for Nokdisaengin who accidentally fell into the water and dropped his carp. Since the crane did not have enough to eat, Nokdisaengin fed it his own arm.

When the crane reached the fields of Seocheon, the god of flowers, plants, and emotions, Hallakgungi, recreated Nokdisaengin's arm. He then gave Nokdisaengin each of the five varieties of Hwansaengkkot (Reincarnation flower). (see Igong Bonpuli)

Nokdisaengin flew the crane back to Odong. Then, he put the Salsalikkot (Flower that revives flesh) on top of Yeosan Buin's bones. Flesh formed around the bones. Next he applied the Pisalikkot (Flower that revives blood. He revived his mother's blood, which once again flowed through his mother's veins. Then he applied the Sumsalikkot (Flower that revives breath), which made his mother breathe again. Finally, Nokdisaengin put the Honsalikkot (Flower that revives soul) on top of his unconscious mother. She eventually awoke, revived and back from the dead.

Cheonjiwang made Yeosan Buin the Jowangsin, the goddess of the kitchen, hearth, and fire, to make up for her time in the icy lake.

Namseonbi became the Japsin (Evil spirit), defender of the dark fertilizer shed, because it was determined that he indirectly blinded himself.

Five of the seven brothers became the deities who each defend a cardinal direction: The eldest was Cheongje of the east, the second was Baekje of the west, the third Jeokje of the south, the fourth Heukje of the north, and the fifth Hwangje of the centre. The sixth, who was nearly murdered by Noiljadae, became Duitmunwang, who guards the back door. The hero Nokdisaengin became Munwangsin, defender of the front door.

Noiljadae became the bathroom goddess, Cheuksin, because she hanged herself in the bathroom. Because of Cheuksin's conflict with Jowangsin, it was taboo in Korean society to have the bathroom next to the kitchen, or to make the bathroom door face the kitchen.

== As a gut ==
Like most Korean mythology told by mudang, or shamans, the Munjeon Bonpuli is a gut, or ritual. This gut was sung and retold when reconstructing or building a house, along with the Seongjugut.

== Comparison with Chilseong Puli ==
The Munjeon Bonpuli is told only in the island of Jeju, but it bears a similar plot to the Chilseong Puli of the mainland.

Similarities

- Both the Chilseong Puli and the Munjeon Bonpuli feature an evil stepmother (Yongye Buin and Noiljadae), an unpaternal father (Chilseongnim and Namseonbi), a dead mother (Maehwa Buin and Yeosan Buin), and seven children.

Differences

- In the Chilseong Puli, there are seven twins; however, in the Munjeon Bonpuli, the seven brothers have a year-wide gap in between their age.
- In the Chilseong Puli, the mother, Maehwa Buin, die of childbirth; however, in the Munjeon Puli, Yeosan Buin drowns.
- In the Chilseong Puli, Chilseongnim does nothing; however, in the Munjeon Bonpuli, Namseonbi goes to Odong to sell grain.
- In the Chilseong Puli, nothing happens; however, in the Munjeon Bonpuli, Noiljadae blinds and fools Namseonbi.
- In the Chilseong Puli, the father, Chilseongnim, tries to kill the seven children; however, in the Munjeon Bonpuli, there is no father-children conflict.
- In the Chilseong Puli, the stepmother, Yongye Buin, bribes the doctor, but in the Munjeon Bonpuli, Noiljadae pretends to be a prophet, a doctor, and a jangseung.
- In the Chilseong Puli, Yongye Buin demands the livers of all seven children; however, in the Munjeon Bonpuli, Noiljadae demands the liver of Nokdisaengin alone.
- In the Chilseong Puli, Maehwa Buin's reincarnation, a golden deer, gives the children her liver as they are about to suicide; however, in the Munjeon Bonpuli, Nokdisaengin purposely hunts and kills a young boar.
- In the Chilseong Puli, Yongye Buin turns into a mole; however, in the Munjeon Bonpuli, Noiljadae becomes the feces deity.
- In the Chilseong Puli, the seven brothers become the seven stars in the Big Dipper; however, in the Munjeon Bonpuli, the seven brothers become various Gasin.

== Beliefs ==
Many things can be gleaned from the culture and beliefs of ancient Korea at the time from the Munjeon Bonpuli.

The villain of the myth is Noiljadae, the concubine of Namseonbi, and also the stepmother of the seven children. This 'evil stepmother' theme is common throughout Korean mythology and legends, and even European ones, such as Cinderella or Snow White.

In the myth, Nokdisaengin, the hero of the myth, becomes the deity of the front gate. As can be known, Koreans at the time believed that the door was a patriarchic area, contrary to the bathroom and the kitchen, considered to be feministic.

Meanwhile, Jowangsin spent many years underwater as a corpse. Thus, she is seen to control water, ice, and fire together, though the aspect as the fire goddess is stronger. This aspect of the goddess is highly natural as the kitchen goddess; the main food of Koreans, steamed rice, requires both water and fire to make it.

The conflict between Yeosan Buin and Noiljadae symbolizes the conflict over concubines and wives to earn the sexual desire of the husband.

== See also ==
- Jowangsin, the deity that Yeosan Buin became
- Gasin faith, the worship of household patrons, including most of the deities in the Munjeon Bonpuli
