= Seongjusin =

Korean deity

- God of the household and breadwinner
- Member of Gasin pantheon
- Other names: Seongjosin
- Hangul: 성주신
- Venerated in: Gasin faith
- Affiliation: Gasin
- Abode: Daecheong
- Symbol: Seongju batangi
- Gender: Male
- Ethnic group: Koreans

Seongjusin (Korean: 성주신; Hanja: 城主神, Korean pronunciation: [sʰʌŋ.dzu.sʰin]) is one of the gods worshipped in Korean Gasin faith. Considered the supreme deity among gasins (가신; 家神; lit. 'household deities'), it is responsible for protecting the breadwinner. It is commonly referred to as Seongju (성주; 城主) or Seongjo (성조; 成造).

Seongjusin is the guardian deity of the house and the eldest among the gasins. For this reason, This deity is enshrined in the daecheong, the cleanest place in the house. People often enshrine the Seongju by folding white paper into the shape of a flower and placing three spoonfuls of the sacred rice offered on the ritual table inside, or by folding white paper into a square and placing the rice inside. Sometimes Seongjusin is enshrined in a Seongju batangi (성주바탱이; lit. 'Seongju jar'). In North Jeolla Province, there was a custom called Ttuk Seongju (뚝성주), in which Seongjusin was worshipped only in one’s heart.

Every year on birthdays or holidays, a Jesa was done for Seongjusin, where housewives prayed for abundance and peace. Although the Seongjusin was worshipped alongside other gasins, when a new family was formed or a family moved to a new home, they would sometimes worship only the Seongjusin for a period of time.
