= Divine judgment =

Judgment of supreme beings within a religion

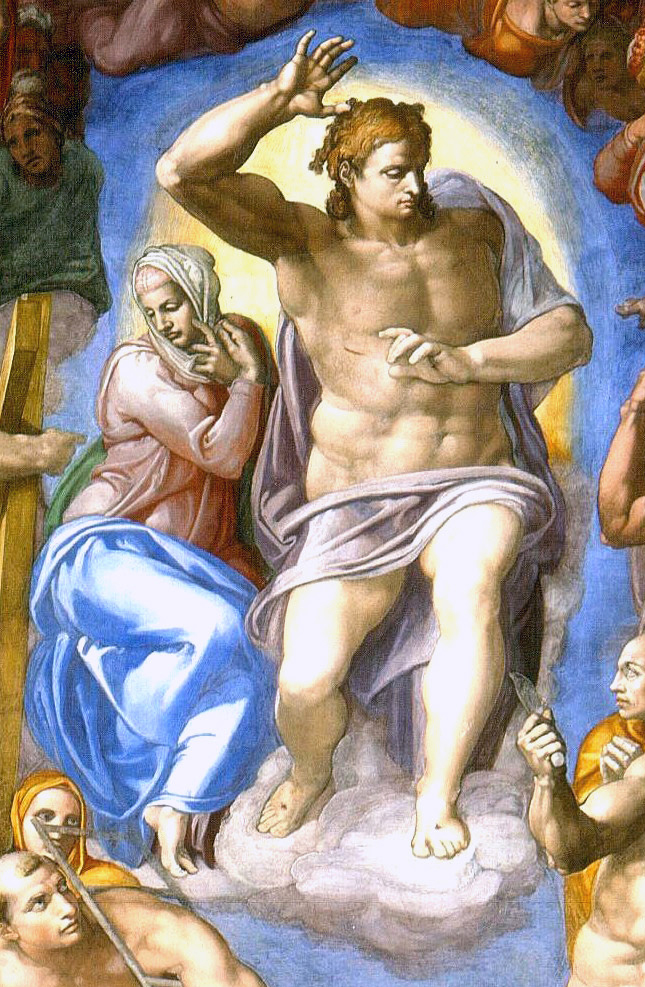
Detail from Michelangelo's The Last Judgment, Sistine Chapel

Divine judgment means the judgment of God or other supreme beings and deities within a religion or a spiritual belief.

== Ancient beliefs ==
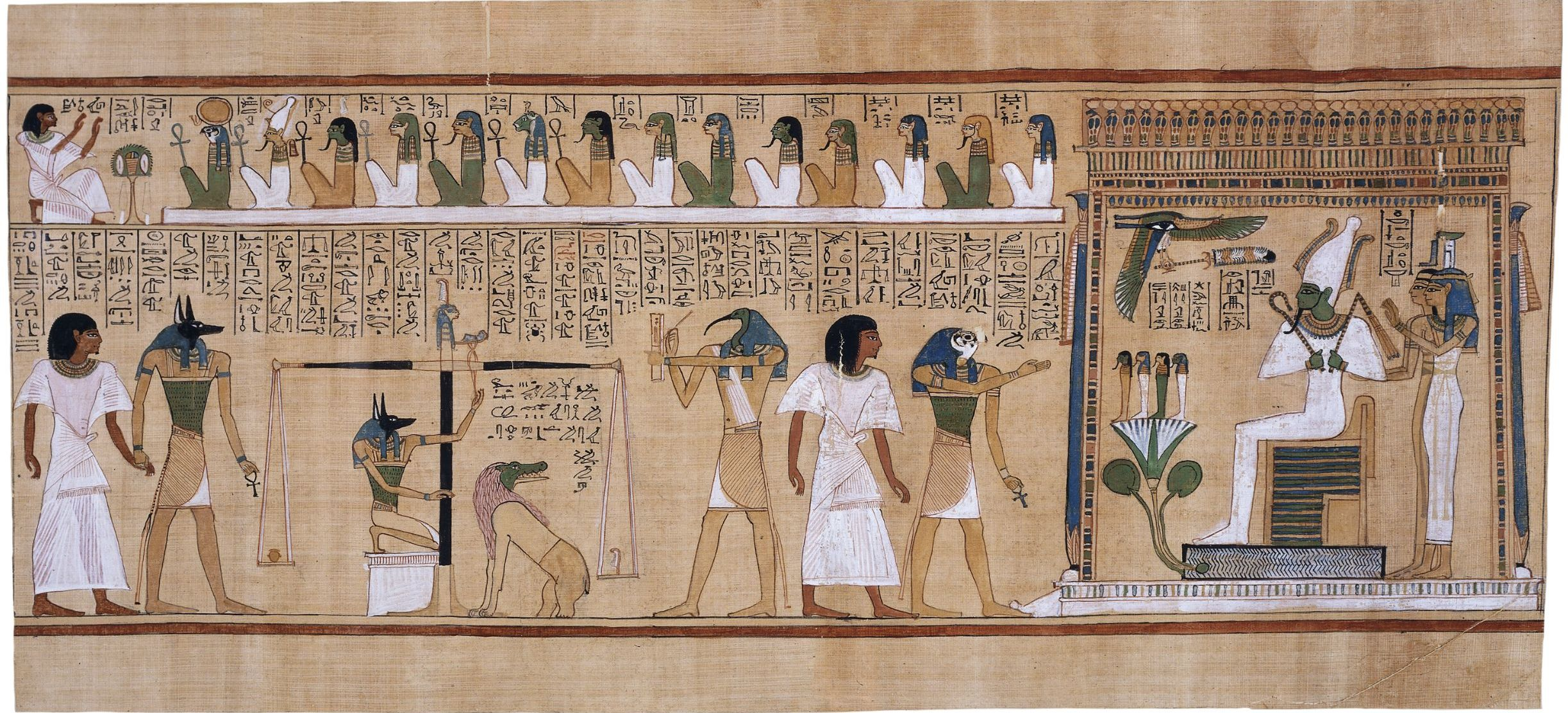
Anubis conducts Hunefer to judgment, where his heart will be weighed against the feather of truth; the fourteen gods above sit in order of judgment, with the underworld ruler Osiris, flanked by Isis and Nephthys, to the right, and the monstrous Ammit waiting next to the scales to devour the souls of those whose hearts are heavier than the feather

In ancient Sumerian religion, the sun-god Utu and his twin sister Inanna were believed to be the enforcers of divine justice. Utu, as the god of the sun, was believed to see all things that happened during the day and Inanna was believed to hunt down and punish those who had committed acts of transgression. After she was raped in her sleep by the gardener Shukaletuda, she unleashed a series of plagues upon the whole world before tracking him down and killing him in the mountains. In another story, she hunted down the old bandit woman Bilulu, who had murdered her husband Dumuzid, and turned her into a waterskin. The Sumerians, as well as later Mesopotamian peoples, believed that all mortals went to the same afterlife: Kur, a cold, dark, cavern deep beneath the earth. Kur was miserable for all people and a person's actions during life had no impact whatsoever on how he or she would be treated in the afterlife.

The idea of a final readjustment beyond the grave, which would rectify the sharp contrast so often observed between the conduct and the fortune of men, was prevalent among all nations in pre-Christian times. Such was the doctrine of metempsychosis or the transmigration of souls, as a justification of the ways of God to man, prevailing among the Hindus of all classes and sects, the Pythagoreans, the Orphic mystics and the Druids among the Celts. The doctrine of a forensic judgment in the unseen world, by which the eternal lot of departed souls is determined, was also widely prevalent in pre-Christian times.

The Pharaonic Egyptian idea of the judgment is set forth with great precision of detail in the "Book of the Dead", a collection of formulas designed to aid the dead in their passage through the underworld.

== Greco-Roman beliefs ==
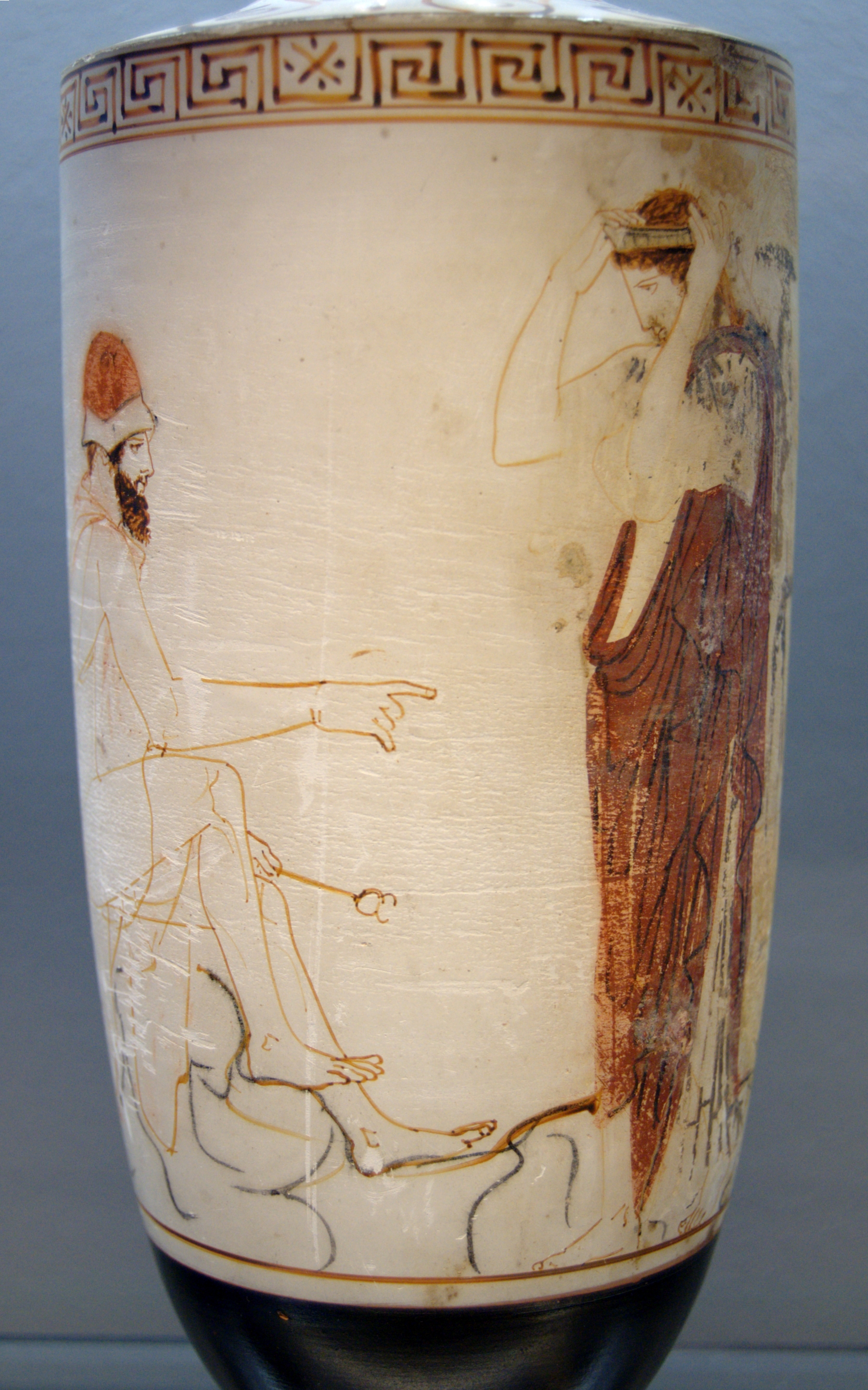
Hermes as Guide of Souls prepares to lead a woman to the afterlife (5th century BC lekythos)

The "Book of the Dead" (Nekyia) in the Odyssey depicts judgment in the afterlife by Minos, the "radiant son of Zeus" who in his mortal life had been king of Crete. Three egregious sinners are singled out for eternal punishment, but the theological implications of the scene are unclear. Plato elaborates on the concept in the myth of Er at the end of the Republic. Each misdeed receives a tenfold penalty, with rewards also proportional. Elsewhere, Plato names the judges as Minos and Rhadamanthys, but he also draws on the tenets of Orphic religion. A third judge was Aeacus; all three were once mortal kings whose excellence as rulers among the living was transferred to the dead. Vergil's depiction of the afterlife in the Aeneid is consonant with the Homeric view as well as that of Plato, and he makes it clear that everyone faces judgment.

The mystery religions of the Hellenistic era offered initiates the hope of salvation through confession, judgment, and forgiveness, as well as ritual purity. The Isaic mysteries were influenced by the traditional religion of ancient Egypt, which had symbolized the judgment of the soul through its weight on the scale of truth. Orphic initiates were buried with devotional texts that provided instructions for navigating the hazards of the underworld and addressing the judges; the soul who speaks correctly will be given a drink from the pool of Memory before joining the heroes who have gone before.

== Judaism ==
Justice and righteousness are such essential attributes of God as to have led to the conviction upon every believer that every evil deed will meet with its due punishment. "Shall not the Judge of all the earth do righteous judgment?" (Gen. 18:25). Great catastrophes as Noah's flood, the destruction of Sodom and Gomorrah, the earthquake that swallowed up Korah and his followers, the plagues of Egypt and the evil that came upon other oppressors of Israel are represented in the Bible as Divine judgments. The end of history, therefore, was conceived to be the execution of the divine judgment upon all the nations. This divine judgment is to take place, according to the Biblical view, on earth, and is intended to be particularly a vindication of Israel.

This Day of Judgment ("Day of the Lord") is portrayed vividly in the Book of Jubilees and particularly in Enoch. The leading idea in Enoch is that the Deluge was the first world-judgment, and that the final judgment of the world is to take place at the beginning or at the close of the Messianic kingdom. The one at the beginning of the Messianic kingdom is more national in its character; the one at the close is to consign all souls either to Paradise or to Gehenna. The fire of the latter consumes the wicked, the heathen often being represented as types of wickedness, while the Israelites are supposed to be saved by their own merit or by that of their fathers. The divine judgment described in the Testament of Abraham is one concerning all souls in the life to come.

There is also a divine judgment which takes place in this world and is continual. "Man is judged daily," says Rabbi Yose. According to the Mishnah, "There are four seasons of the year when the world is judged: in spring (Passover) regarding the yearly produce; in early summer (Shavuot) regarding the fruit of the trees; on Sukkot regarding the winter's rain; and on Rosh Hashana, when man is judged." Due to these views, the 1st of Tishri became-the Day of Judgment in the Jewish liturgy. Not yet recognized as such in the time of Josephus and Philo, this season of repentance and penitential prayer removed from the Jew that gloom and dread of the Last Judgment Day so prevalent in Essene life and literature and gave to Jewish ethics its more practical, healthy character.

== Christian ==
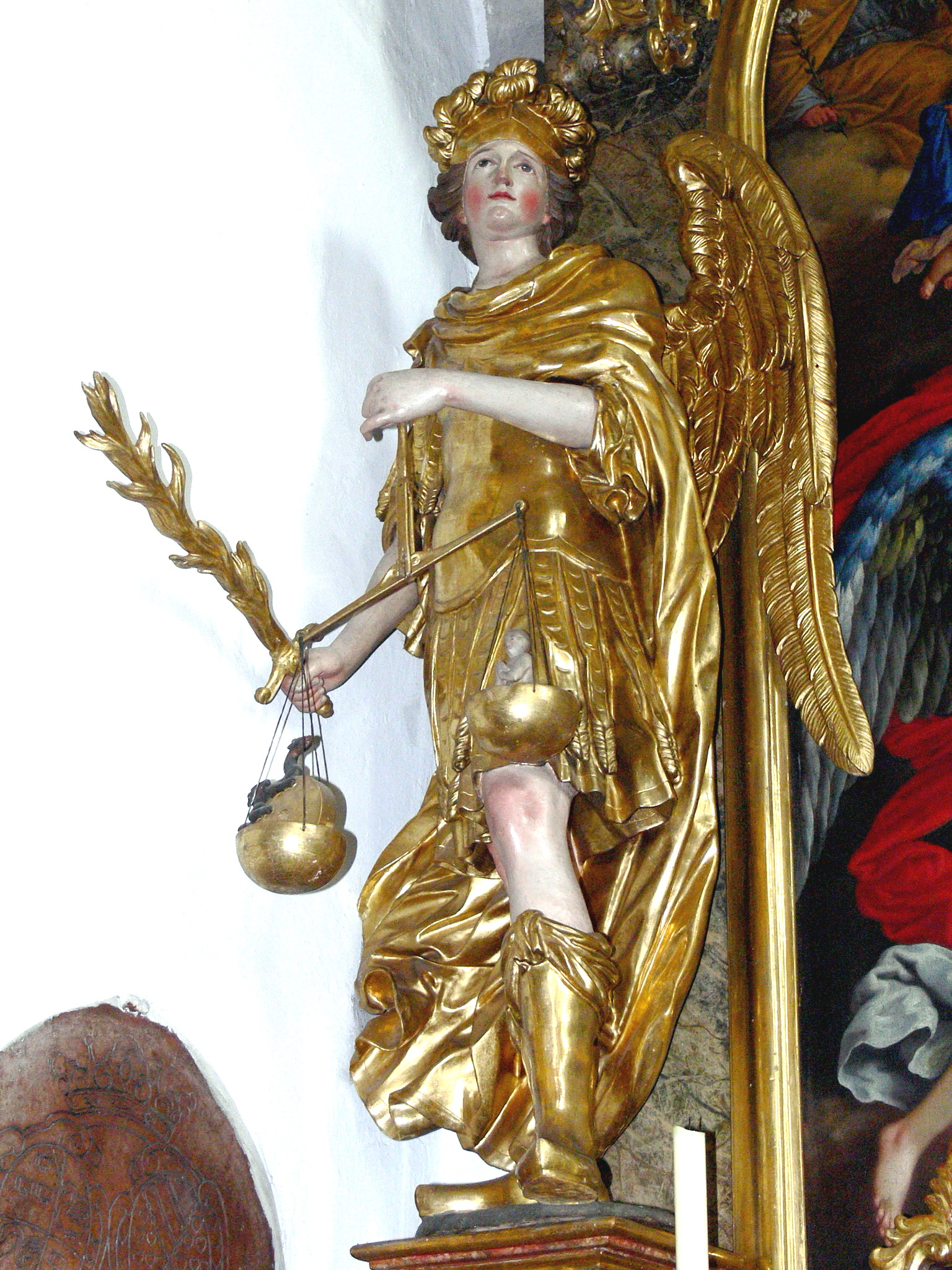
St. Michael weighing souls, Abtenau

=== Catholic doctrine ===
==== Objective and subjective judgment ====
In Catholic doctrine, divine judgment (Latin judicium divinum), as an imminent act of God, denotes the action of God's retributive justice by which the destiny of rational creatures is decided according to their merits and demerits. This includes:

- God's knowledge of the moral worth of the acts of free creatures, and His decree determining the just consequences of such acts;
- the Divine verdict upon a creature amenable to the moral law, and the execution of this sentence by way of reward and punishment.

In the beginning, God pronounced judgment upon the whole race, as a consequence of the fall of its representatives, the first parents (Genesis Genesis). Death and the infirmities and miseries of this were the consequences of that original sentence. Besides this common judgment there have been special judgments on particular individuals and peoples. The fear of God is such a fundamental idea in the Old Testament that it insists mainly on the punitive aspect of the judgment (cf. Proverbs 11:31; Ezekiel 14:21).

There is also a judgment of God in the world that is subjective. By their acts a person adheres to or deviates from the law of God, and thereby places themselves within the sphere of approval or condemnation. In a sense then, each individual exercises judgment on themselves. Hence it is declared that Christ came not to judge but to save (John 3:17; 8:15; 12:47). The internal judgment proceeds according to a person's attitude: towards Christ (John 3:18).

=== Presbyterian ===
The idea that God is now and will be at the end the judge of every human life is both biblical teaching or doctrine that is fundamental to understanding Christian faith according to the Presbyterian view. The Lord's present judgment of human life anticipates that perfect and final judgment that he will impose upon mankind at the end of the age. Christians will also have to face the judgment of the Lord and receive what is due them for the deeds done in the body, whether good or evil.

== Islam ==
In Islam, "the promise and threat" (waʿd wa-waʿīd) of Judgement Day (Arabic: یوم القيامة, romanized: Yawm al-qiyāmah, lit. 'Day of Resurrection' or Arabic: یوم الدین, romanized: Yawm ad-din, lit. 'Day of Judgement'), is when "all bodies will be resurrected" from the dead, and "all people" are "called to account" for their deeds and their faith during their life on Earth. It has been called "the dominant message" of the holy book of Islam, the Quran, (Note: "as it is presented in the context" of monotheism) and resurrection and judgement the two themes "central to the understanding of Islamic eschatology." Judgement Day is considered a fundamental tenet of faith by all Muslims, and one of the six articles of Islamic faith.

The trials, tribulations, and details associated with it are detailed in the Quran and the Hadith (sayings of Muhammad); these have been elaborated on in creeds, Quranic commentaries (tafsịrs), theological writing, eschatological manuals to provide more details and a sequence of events on the Day. Islamic expositors and scholarly authorities who have explained the subject in detail include al-Ghazali, Ibn Kathir, Ibn Majah, Muhammad al-Bukhari, and Ibn Khuzaymah.

== Historical ==
St Gildas interpreted the Saxon invasions of England in 5th-6th centuries as just punishment for the sins of the Britons. The Viking attacks of the 8th-11th centuries were widely interpreted as being divine punishment upon Christians. Plagues, earthquakes and other similar disasters were also often looked upon as punishment in much of Christian history. The Reformation was sometimes interpreted by Catholics as a divine punishment upon the Church.

In his Second Inaugural Address Abraham Lincoln cited the then on-going war as Divine Judgment visited upon the nation for the offense of slavery.

The Almighty has His own purposes. "Woe unto the world because of offenses; for it must needs be that offenses come, but woe to that man by whom the offense cometh." If we shall suppose that American slavery is one of those offenses which, in the providence of God, must needs come, but which, having continued through His appointed time, He now wills to remove, and that He gives to both North and South this terrible war as the woe due to those by whom the offense came, shall we discern therein any departure from those divine attributes which the believers in a living God always ascribe to Him? Fondly do we hope, fervently do we pray, that this mighty scourge of war may speedily pass away. Yet, if God wills that it continue until all the wealth piled by the bondsman's two hundred and fifty years of unrequited toil shall be sunk, and until every drop of blood drawn with the lash shall be paid by another drawn with the sword, as was said three thousand years ago, so still it must be said "the judgments of the Lord are true and righteous altogether.

== See also ==
- Divine retribution
- General judgment
  - Particular judgment
  - Last Judgment
- Last judgment
- Divine command theory
- Revenge
- Dongti (divine punishment in Korean mythology)
- Mandate of Heaven
- Category:Justice deities
