= Sosamsin =

Household deity in Korean mythology

Sosamshin (Korean: 소삼신; lit. 'Birth Goddess of the Cow') is a Gashin, or household deity, in Korean mythology. As her name reveals, she is the goddess of the birth of cattle, just as Samshin is the goddess of human birth.

== Etymology ==
In the Korean language, So refers to cattle.'Samshin' is the birth goddess for the humans. 'Sosamshin' is a joining of these two words.

== Worship ==
Mostly, Sosamshin was worshipped as Gungeong. The term Gungeong refers to the worship of a deity without a particular ritual, venerating them only in the mind.

Sosamshin was properly worshipped in only the four days before and after the birth of a cattle. If a cow was pregnant, the family held a feast to Sosamshin in the stable, asking the deity to aid the cow in her delivery. Clear water was sacrificed to Sosamshin. When a cow was having delivery, the family sacrificed steamed rice, other dishes, and dirty water to Sosamshin. The sacrifice was then fed to the cow.

After the delivery, ropes were knotted leftwards. Paper were hung on the ropes, and the ropes were stretched across the door or the stable. For four days after the delivery, people who had entered a house where someone had recently died, seen something dead, or had said something bad about the newborn cattle were forbidden to enter the house, as it was believed that if such a person came into the house, the mother would not nurse the young cattle. If the newborn cattle acted strangely, a shaman read out an incantation.

Im Gangwon region, 'San' or 'Guneung' is god of cattle. San and Guneung is similar to Sosamsin. Most of San and Guneung are in front of the stables where the cattle are located, and when the cattle is sick or trying to give birth to a baby, house owner pray in front of San and Guneung.
