= Daecheong =

Traditional Korean floors

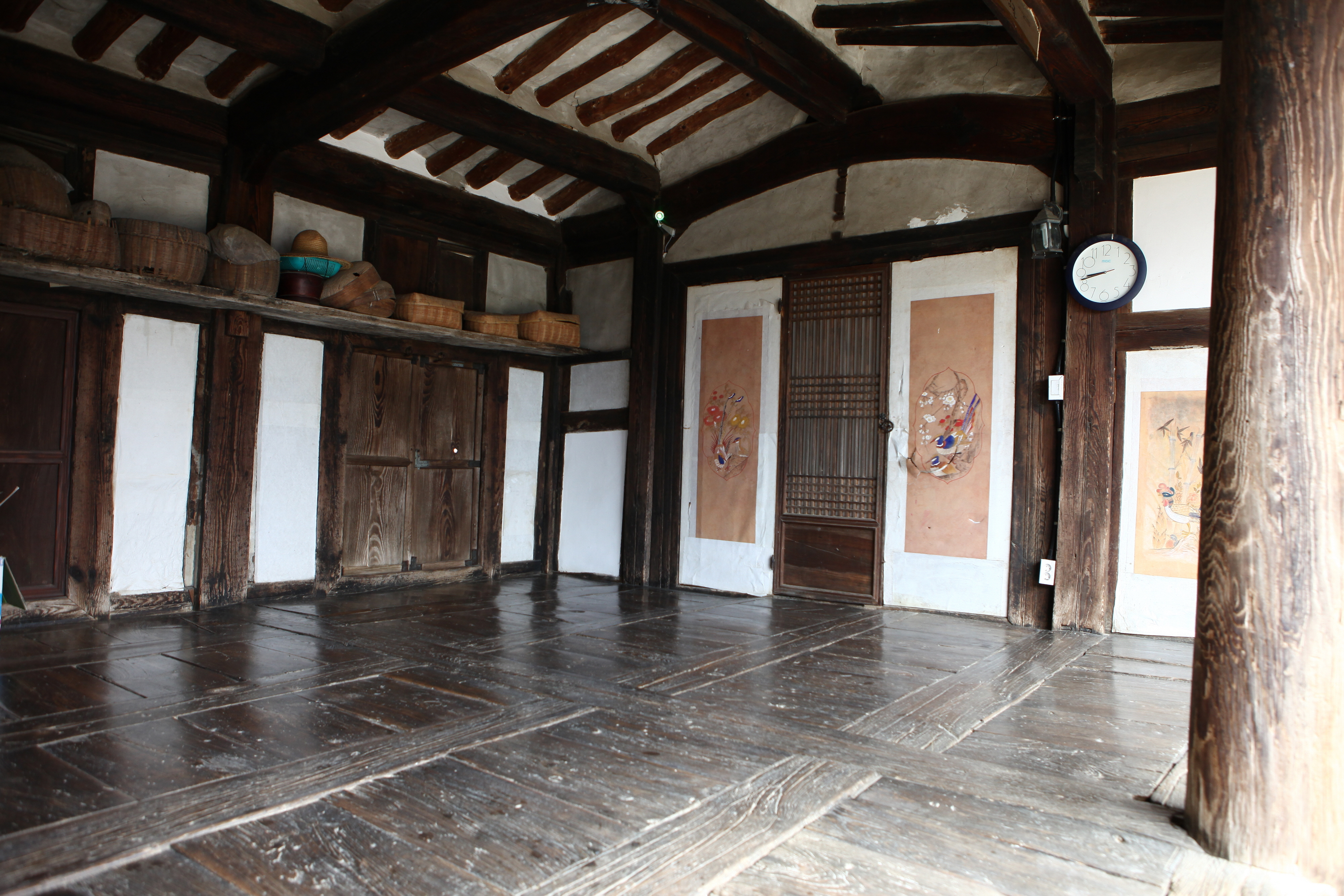
Unjoru Historic House, Gurye

Daecheong (Korean: 대청) is a large wooden floor between the rooms of the main building in a traditional Korean home, called hanok. It frequently appeared in larger houses where upper-class people such as yangban lived. It was used as a place to hold ancestral rites.

== Overview ==
Daecheong is used as a place that symbolizes status and authority, as a space for performing ancestral rites or as a place to worship a vassal called the seongju (성주). It is located in the center of the house and has a central function that dominates the other rooms in terms of space.

The floor material and structure are made of wood and the floor is raised from the ground, so ventilation is possible underneath. In addition, some of the exterior walls are open or can be easily opened and closed. In upper-class houses, there is usually an andaecheong (안대청) in anchae and a sarangdaecheong (사랑대청) in sarangchae, and these are usually located in the center of each house. In addition, the inside is not visible from the yard, and mats are laid on the floor.
