= Munsin =

God in Korean shamanism

- God of Door
- Member of Gasin pantheon
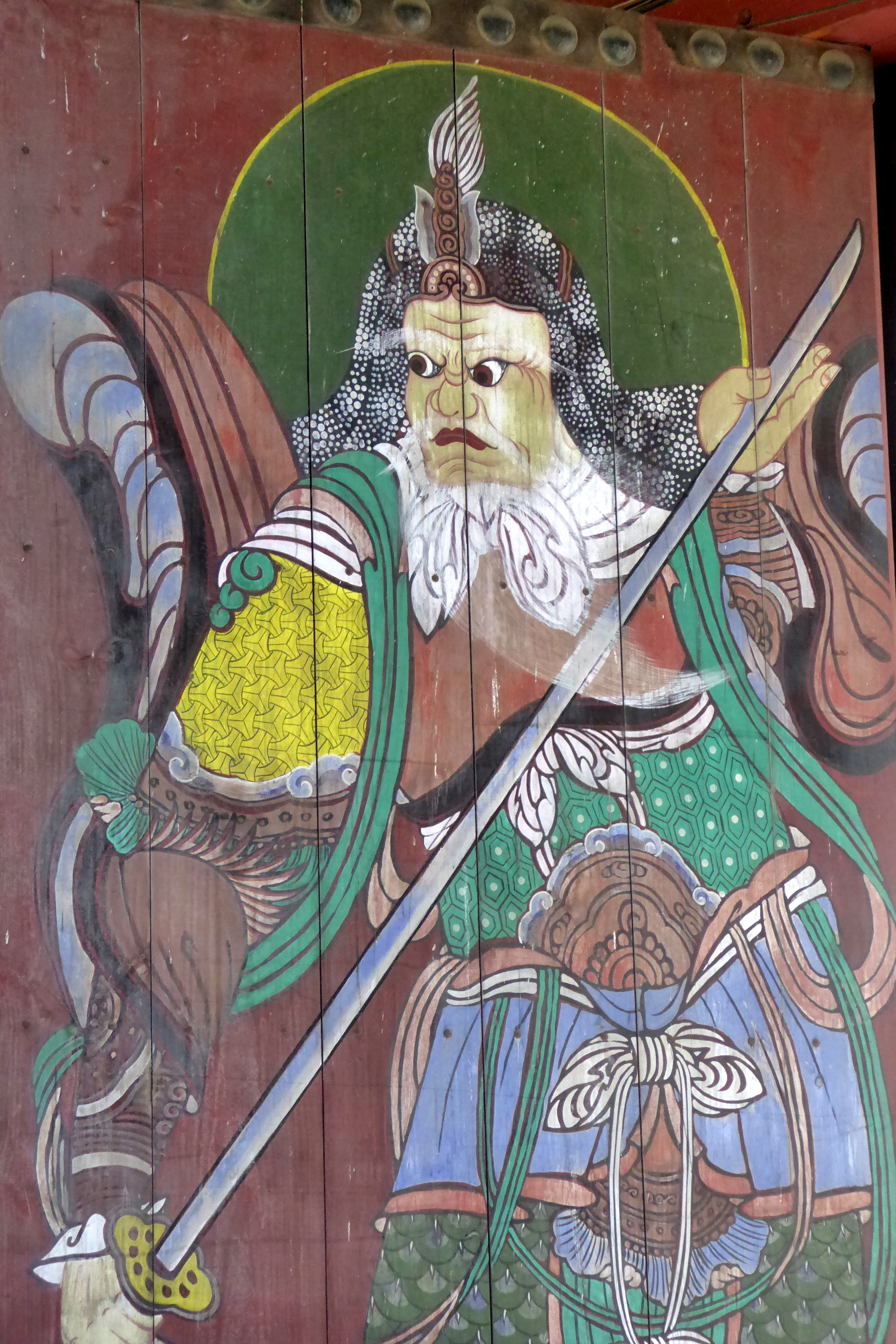
- Painted Munsin on the Door of the Jinyeomun Gate, Bongeunsa.
- Other names: Munjeonsin
- Hangul: 문신
- Venerated in: Gasin faith
- Affiliation: Gasin
- Major cult centre: Jeju Island
- Abode: Door
- Ethnic group: Koreans
- Festivals: Munjeonje

Equivalents
- Chinese: Menshen

Munsin (Korean: 문신; Hanja: 門神, literally Door god), known in the southernly Jeju Island as Munjeonsin (문전신; 門前神) is the god of the door in Korean shamanism. The worship of Munsin is strongest in Jeju Island, where Munsin (known as Munjeonsin) is one of the most-worshipped deities; however, the worship of Munsin also exists in the mainland.

== History ==
The first Munsin-like entity that is recorded in Korean history is Cheoyong. According to the history book Samguk Yusa, Cheoyong successfully repulsed the disease deity, who was having sex with his wife. After the repulse of the disease god, the people of the kingdom of Silla attached portraits of Cheoyong on their front gates to ward off disease.

In the Goryeo period, the traditional worship of Munsin was influenced by Taoist rituals. During the reign of King Yejong, it is recorded that Taoist believers made statues of the door god. One of the most common worship of Munsin in the mainland, the attachment of pictures or writing on the front doors, originated from Taoism.

== On the mainland ==
The mainland worship of Munsin is very weak compared to the worship of Munsin in Jeju Island. Munsin worship is almost nonexistent in the countryside, and a limited form appears in Seoul and neighboring regions. Unlike most Gashin, Munsin was mostly worshipped in cities, where the importance of the door was significantly higher than in the countryside.

In the mainland, Munsin was believed to embody an amulet, a portrait of Cheoyong, a picture of a tiger or a rooster, or a calligraphy of 'Ibchun Daegil', all attached to the door. The god was worshipped in October, after worshipping Seongjushin(deity of the house). The worship was very short, simply spraying rice wine and placing tteok in front of the door.

== On Jeju Island ==
However, in Jeju Island, Munsin is the greatest of the household deities, or Gashin. In the mainland, Seongjusin (god of the house) is the greatest Gasin; however, in Jeju, Seongjusin does not exist, and his niche is replaced by Munsin.

Jeju Islanders believe in two door gods; Ilmunsin, the god of the front door, and Dwitmunsin, the god of the back door. However, there is no ritual for Dwitmunsin, and 'Munsin' mostly refers to Ilmunsin.

The ritual to Munsin is called the Munjeonje. The ritual occurred in Lunar January, but if January was not available, the ritual could be done in Lunar March. In the Munjeonje, the shaman sacrificed a rooster, sprayed its blood on the door, and buried its head in the door.

Munjeon was believed to embody strips of paper and red, blue, and yellow clothes, hung on the door. In the annual Munjeonje, the old strips were replaced by new ones; this was called 'dressing Munjeon'. This ceremony could be done only after sacrificing fruits and water to Munjeon, burning incense, and kneeling before the door.

In the last parts of the Munjeonje, the family sacrificed five different kinds of fruits to Munjeon. The fruits were citron, apple, pear, jujube, and nutmeg. After the sacrifice, the family shared the fruits.

When someone temporarily left the house, the person who was leaving the house held a ritual to Munjeon in dawn, praying for safety and luck.

During marriage, the newlyweds prayed to Munjeon, using the food that was used in the marriage as a sacrifice. During this ritual, a pig's head, wine, and incense was necessary. After the ritual, the sacrificed food was thrown onto the roof.

== In mythology ==
In the Munjeon Bonpuli myth, Munjeon acts as the main character. This myth shows how the seventh son of Yeosan Buin became the door god.

Munsin also appears as a secondary character in the Chasa Bonpuli myth. When the hero Gangrim Doryeong heads to the netherworld, he encounters ninety-nine paths, each heading in a different direction. Suddenly, Munjeon appears, and tells Gangrim Doryeong the story of each trail. Lastly, Munjeon shows Gangrim Doryeong the trail that the mortal Gangrim Doryeong would take, and Gangrim Doryeong follows the trail into the netherworld.

== See also ==
- Menshen
- Doorway worship
