= Sotdae =

Wooden pole or stone pillar in Korean folk belief

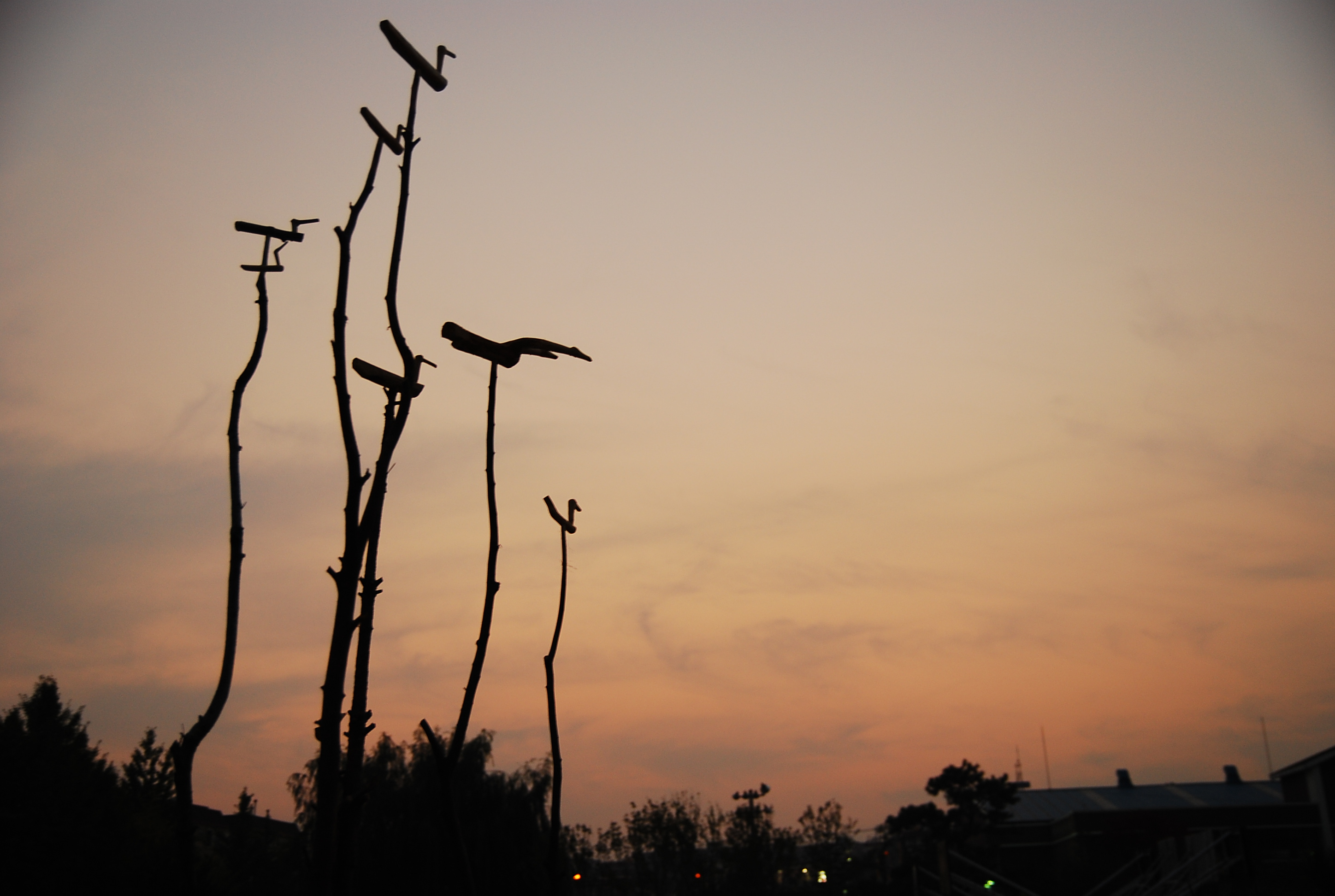

Korean name
- Hangul: 솟대
- RR: sotdae
- MR: sottae

A sotdae (Korean pronunciation: [sot.t͈ɛ]) is a tall wooden pole or stone pillar with a carved bird on its top, built for the purpose of folk belief in Korea. Like jangseung, wooden totem poles with a sculpted human face, it was usually erected near the entrance of a village to ward off evil spirits as well as to represent villagers' wishes for prosperity and well-being. Later, it was also built as a celebratory or commemorative symbol. For instance, when a son of a family passed a civil service examination called gwageo, a sotdae was set up in the yard. In that case, it was colored in orange and topped with a blue dragon.

== Features ==
Sotdae were generally set up alone, but sometimes, along with jangseung (Korean totem poles), doltap (돌탑, a pagoda built with stone) or sinmok (신목, sacred trees). It was worshiped as a village guardian. The birds may look like wild geese, crows or ibises in some areas, but ducks are the most common. Sotdae have different names according to regions; soju (소주), sojutdae (소줏대) in Jeolla Province, soldae (솔대) in Gangwon Province and Hamhung district, byeolsindae (별신대) in coastal areas of Gyeongsang Province, and sotdaek (솟댁) in Hwanghae and Pyeongan Province. Pyojutdae (표줏대), georitdae (거릿대), susalmok (수살목) and seonangdae (선앙대) are other names.

Nothing precise is known about the sotdae's origin. However, sotdae was believed to be sanctified as a village guardian from when people started agriculture and the unit of society formed based on agricultural villages. Later, as a concept of feng shui prevailed and values of success and honour became important, its meaning seemed to be differentiated from an object of worship to a totem for abundant harvest. Ducks, as migratory birds, had various religious symbols and made the meanings of sotdae more diverse.

== Origins of worshipping sotdae ==
The worship of sotdae-like objects was commonly found in North Asia. Figures or patterns on Bronze Age relics that included a pole with a bird on it were discovered around these areas. As people began to develop techniques for metalworking and increased their agriculture production, power differences among tribes emerged. Dominating class sought a political and religious foundation needed to maintain their powers from gods in the heaven. So it was assumed that appearance of sotdae stemmed from the integration between "Cosmic Tree" and "Sky-Birds".

A similar sacred pole is found among the Omaha tribe of the central United States.

== Components of sotdae and their meanings ==
=== Poles and posts ===
Poles and posts have religious and symbolic meanings around the world. Poles of sotdae are related to 'the world-axis'. There are three cosmic levels in the concept of the universe in Northern Asian shamanism — upper, middle, and lower level. They are connected to each other by the world-axis. A tree has roots extending into the earth and also grows toward the sky, which could be a symbol for the world-axis. So the wooden poles or posts were possibly considered to be a pathway for spiritual beings to come down to earth and they became a sacred object to worship by themselves. A similar record was found in a book titled Dongguksesigi (동국세시기, 東國歲時記), which said that 12 wooden poles were set up to welcome a god on February 2 in Jeju Island. Also Dangun 's father, Hwanung, descended from the heaven to the top of a tree, Sindansu (신단수, 神壇樹) in Korea's founding myth. People selected a tree which was beyond the reach of humans and they conducted ceremonial rites before they cut down the tree. On top of that, the poles and posts were believed to offer protection a village against calamities and disasters and also acted like a mast in a U-shaped land area balancing and making the land stable.

=== Birds ===
Sotdae birds may be wild geese, gulls, ibises, Korean magpies or crows, but most commonly they are ducks. Ducks give an important symbolic meaning to sotdae. They are able to travel on water as well as on land and in the air and also can go under water. Because of the relation to water, ducks were regarded to have an ability to control rain and thunder, to survive in the floods and to protect a village from fire. This belief made people think of ducks as a guardian in ancient agricultural societies. Relating to this, a scholar named Lee Gyubo (이규보, 李奎報 1168–1241) wrote a following phrase in his garland called Donggukisanggukjip (동국이상국집, 東國李相國集: Collected works of Minister Yi of Korea): "Because of the rain for 7 days in a row, the capital of Songyang was submerged. The king, Jumong, was riding a duck horse stretching a reed rope across the river and his people were all holding that rope." This suggests that people considered a duck as a rescuer from flood.

Another characteristic of ducks is that they are migratory birds coming to Korea in autumn. Migratory birds appear and disappear on a regular basis and it was believed that ducks travel to the world beyond the Earth and act as a messenger between the physical world and the realm of the spirits. In agriculture, this periodicity might be associated with the cycle of monsoon which brings rain. Also, the fact that ducks are fertile species and lay bigger eggs than chickens do would be a good reason for ducks to be an idolized object representing abundance.

==== Meaning of the number of birds and their direction ====
The shape of birds on sotdae was carved as minutely as possible but it was sometimes simplified to just Y or ㄱ shape. The number of birds seated on sotdae was different from village to village, from one to three. Commonly one bird was seated on a pole, but sometimes two or three birds on a Y-shape branch were found on a pole — either facing each other or facing the same direction. Nothing is exactly known concerning the number of birds but it is assumed that the number of birds on a pole was decided according to the number of places which 'qi' should be complemented. The direction of the bird's heads varies. People made sotdae erected toward south to wish moderate weather for farming or let it direct north to bring rain. Sometimes sotdae turned toward the outside of the village to make sure that ducks take all the evil spirits and fly away.

== See also ==
- Jangseung
- Dol hareubang
- Totem pole
- Korean shamanism
