= Jowangsin =

Goddess of fire and the hearth in Korean shamanism

- Goddess of the Kitchen and Hearth
- Member of Gasin pantheon
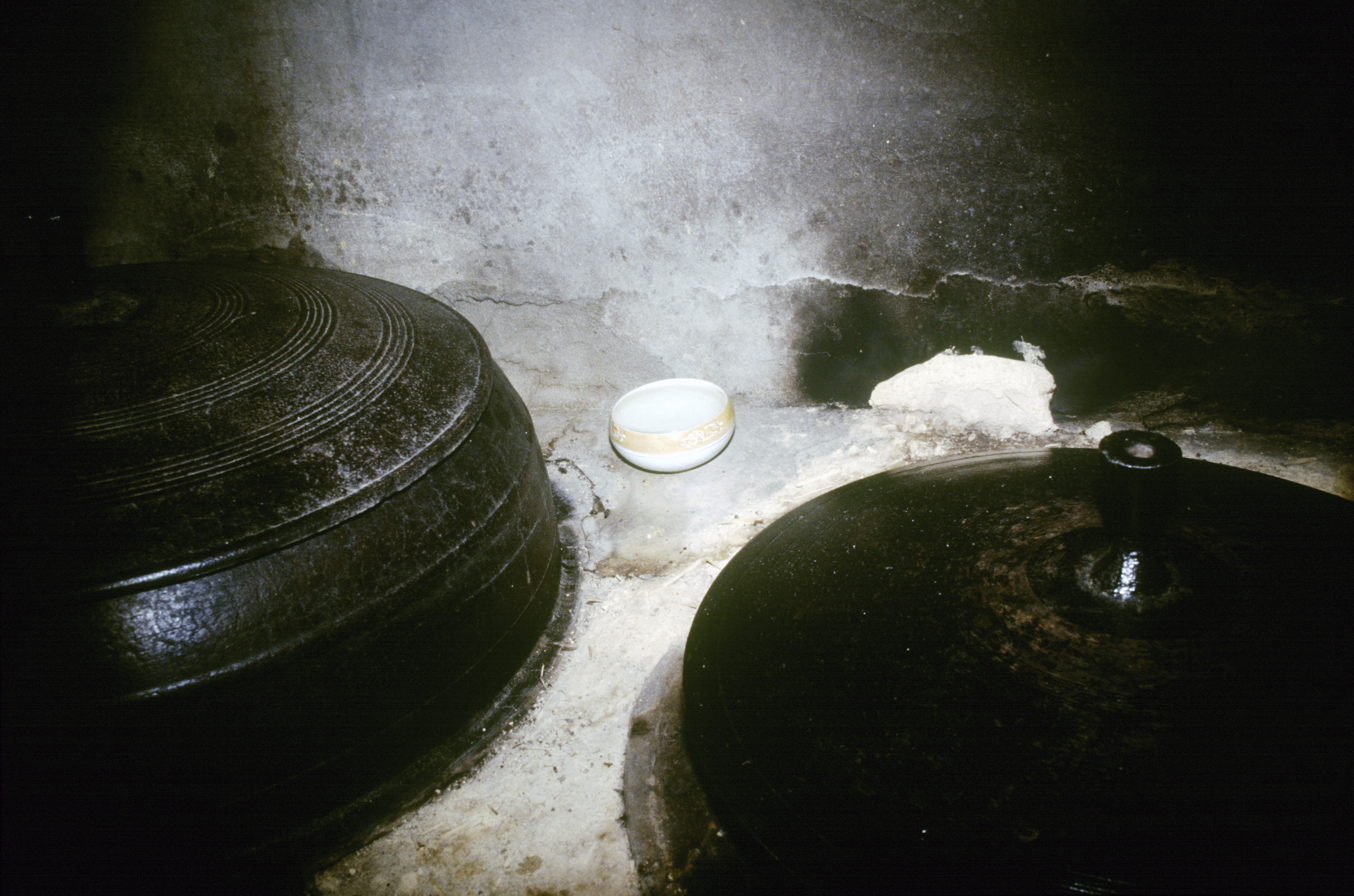
- A bowl of water dedicated to Jowangsin.
- Other names: Joshin; Jowanggaxi; Jowangdaeshin; Buttumakshin
- Hangul: 조왕신
- Venerated in: Gasin faith
- Affiliation: Gasin
- Abode: Kitchen
- Gender: Female
- Ethnic group: Koreans
- Temple: Jowanggak

Equivalents
- Greek: Hestia
- Roman: Vesta
- Chinese: Zàojūn
- Japanese: Kōjin
- Vientnamese: Ông Táo
- Ainu: Kamuy-huci

Jowangsin (Korean: 조왕신; Hanja: 竈王神) is the goddess of fire and the hearth in Korean shamanism. As the goddess of the hearth, the rituals dedicated to her were generally kept alive by housewives. Although Jowangsin is rarely worshipped in ordinary Korean households today, she is still worshipped in the Gongyanggan—the kitchen of Korean Buddhist temples.

== History ==
It is regarded that Jowangsin was worshipped by the Korean people for millennia, since the Proto Three Kingdoms era. For example, in the Sanguo Zhi, a history book of China, there are records of a kitchen god. "The method of offering ancestral rites to ghosts is different, but everyone worships the kitchen god on the west side of the gate."

== Ritual ==
Jowangsin was regarded to embody a bowl of water held on a clay altar above the hearth. The housewife awoke early every morning and poured fresh water from a nearby well into the bowl, then knelt before it, wishing for luck. The ritual of Jowangshin was especially well developed in southern Korea. Also, every festival Jowangshin was honored with Tteok (rice cake) and fruits.

== Five taboos ==
Because Jowangsin was believed to write down the happenings within the house and broadcast them to heaven, housewives had to follow five rules:

1. Do not curse while in the hearth.
2. Do not sit on the hearth.
3. Do not place your feet on the hearth.
4. Maintain the cleanliness of the kitchen.
5. You may worship other deities in the kitchen.

== In mythology ==
The origin of Jowangsin appears in the Munjeon Bonpuli, a myth of Jeju Island.

Meanwhile, Jowangsin can be vengeful against those who do not honor the five taboos. In the Seongjugut, the envoy of heaven, Okhwang Chasa, cannot enter the house of Hwanguyangssi because of the glorious and intimidating armor of Hwanguyangssi. However, the Jowangsin reveals how to get past this obstacle. The solution is to capture Hwanguyangssi at sunrise, when he undresses and climbs a nearby mountain to visit his parents. The reason for Jowangsin betraying her master is because Hwanguyangssi throws his muddy shoes in the kitchen, and his wife Makmak Buin puts knives above the hearth.

The same aspect is shown in the Jangja Puli. There, the three Jeoseung Sajas, Gangrim Doryeong, Hae Wonmaek, and Yi Deokchun, are aided by Jowangsin as they attempt to send the evil Samajangja to the underworld. In here, she appears as a crone wearing a crown made of seven treasures. The goddess tells the death gods that Samajangja is sleeping in the visitors' quarters, or Haenglangchae, to avoid death. The reason for this betrayal is because Samajangja places his feet on the hearth every morning and evening and throws knives around the kitchen.

However, Jowangsin can be a benevolent deity. In the Chasa Bonpuli, the hero (who later becomes a death god)'s wife serves rice cake, or tteok, to Jowang in preparations for Gangrim Doryeong's quest.

When Gangrim Doryeong goes west to the underworld, he finds a crone who has a bent back. No matter how much Gangrim Doryeong ran, he could never catch up. When Gangrim Doryeong nearly fainted of fatigue, the crone sat under a tree.

When Gangrim Doryeong took out his tteok, the crone took out her tteok, which looked and tasted the same as Gangrim Doryeong's tteok. The crone then revealed that she was Jowangsin, and that she had guided Gangrim Doryeong so far. She also said that there were 78 trails leading from 'that' trail, and that one would lead to the underworld. Jowangsin additionally mentioned that her help was because of Gangrim Doryeong's wife, even though Jowangsin was personally angry at Gangrim Doryeong (who practically lived with prostitutes and lived on makgeolli, or rice wine).

== Other names ==
- Josin (Kitchen goddess, 조신, 竈神)
- Jowanggaxi (Woman who is the king of the kitchen, 조왕각시, 竈王각시)
- Jowangdaesin (Great goddess and king of the kitchen, 조왕대신, 竈王大神)
- Buttumaksin (Goddess of the hearth, 부뚜막신, 부뚜막神)

== See also ==
- Kitchen god
- Zàojūn, Chinese kitchen god
- Kōjin, Japanese kitchen god
- Ông Táo, Vietnamese kitchen god
- Kamuy-huci, an Ainu kitchen god
- Hestia, Greek goddess of the hearth
- Vesta (mythology), Roman goddess of the hearth
- Gasin cult, the worship of house deities (Gasin), including Jowangshin, in Korean shamanism
- Teojusin, another Gashin
