= Jangseung =

Korean ceremonial pole

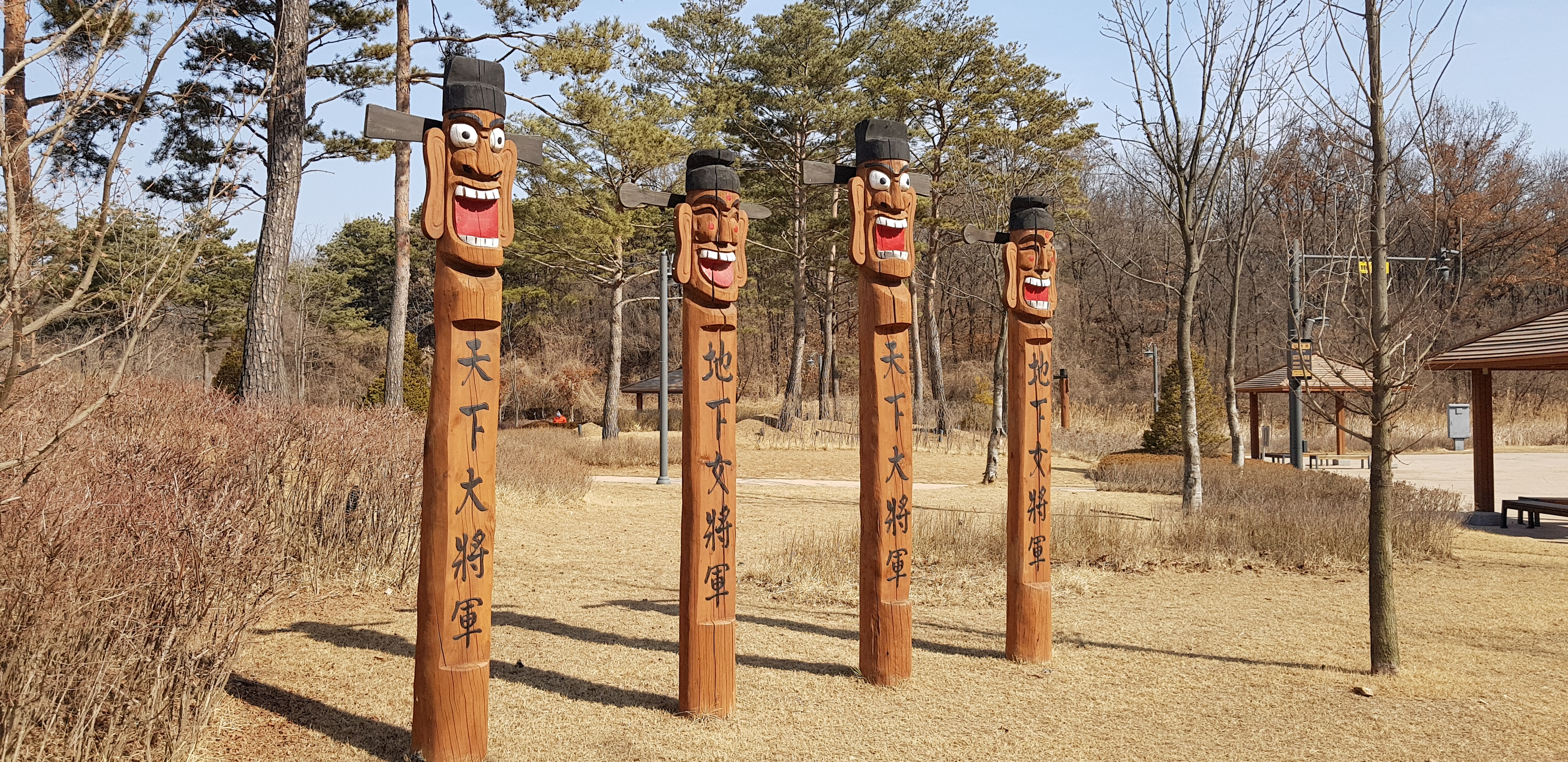

Korean name
- Hangul: 장승
- Hanja: 長栍
- RR: jangseung
- MR: changsŭng

Other names
- Hangul: 법수; 벅수
- RR: beopsu; beoksu
- MR: pŏpsu; pŏksu

A jangseung (Korean: 장승) or village guardian is a Korean ceremonial pole, usually made of wood. Jangseungs were traditionally placed at the edges of villages to mark village boundaries and frighten away demons. They were also worshipped as village tutelary deities.

== Variations ==
In the southern regions of Jeolla, Chungcheong, and Gyeongsang, jangseungs are also referred to as beopsu or beoksu, a variation of boksa (복사; 卜師), meaning a male shaman.

In the Jeolla region, jangseungs are often made of stone bearing some resemblance to the Dol hareubangs of Jeju Island.

== History ==
In Seoul, 18th century Joseon Dynasty King Jeongjo ordered jangseungs erected in the area near Sangdo-dong to ward off evil spirits when he made a royal procession to Suwon, where his father's tomb was located. Since then, the district has been called Jangseungbaegi and has given its name to the Jangseungbaegi Station on the Seoul Metropolitan Subway's Line 7.

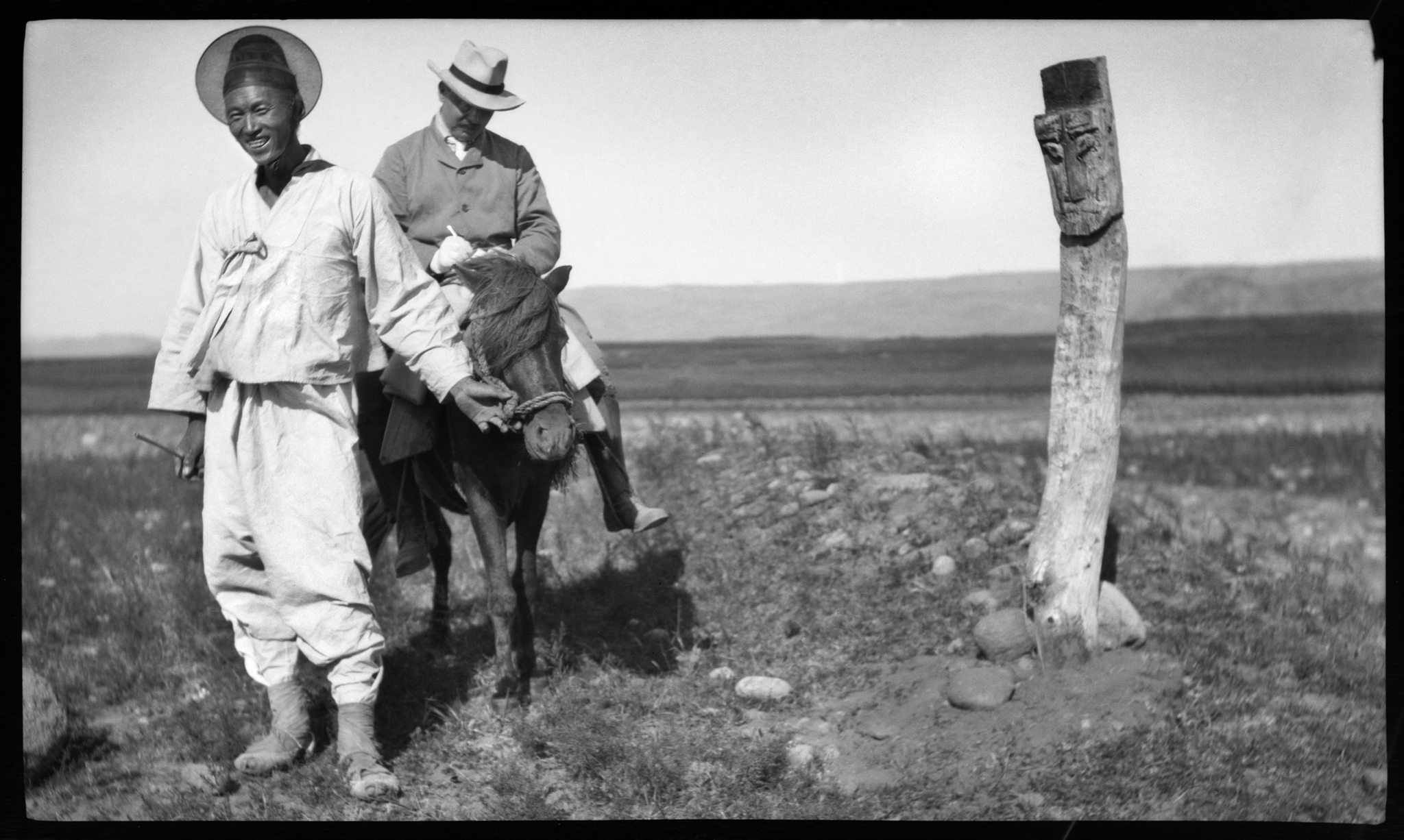
Western scholar inspecting a jangseung erected at the entrance to the village during the journey from Seongjin, Hamgyeongbuk-do to Gilju. (September, 1906)

Jangseungs are usually adorned with inscriptions describing the personae of the carved figures along the front of the poles. "Male" jangseungs usually bear inscriptions in Hanja or Hangul reading "Great General of All Under Heaven," or Cheonha-daejanggun (천하대장군; 天下大將軍) and are decorated with headpieces resembling those worn by Korean aristocrats or scholars. "Female" jangseungs, on the other hand, wear less elaborate headpieces and usually bear inscriptions reading "Female General of the Underworld," or Jiha-yeojanggun (지하여장군; 地下女將軍) or "Great General of the Underworld," or Jiha-daejanggun (지하대장군; 地下大將軍).

Toraijin from Korea brought Korean elements to Japan such as Korean shamanism that can be seen throughout modern Japan today. One of the many relics is the presence of jangseungs, known as Shōgunhyō (将軍標) in Japan, wooden or stone totems (found normally in pairs) that are believed to ward off evil from sacred places. Many temples and areas that were inhabited/founded by Korean immigrants often incorporate jangseungs in the architecture.

== Place ==
Depending on the location or affiliation, jangseung can be divided into village guardian, temple guardian, and public guardian.

The village guardian is the god of dongje, and has the functions of village guardian, mural, expelling the harmful ghosts, fire prevention, and gathering happiness for the village.

The temple guardian post has the function of protecting the temple from the invisible evil spirits. The temple guardian is the boundary mark of the temple.

The public guardian is a milestone and a street god to protect the safety of the gate, barracks, and roads and sea roads.

== Gallery ==
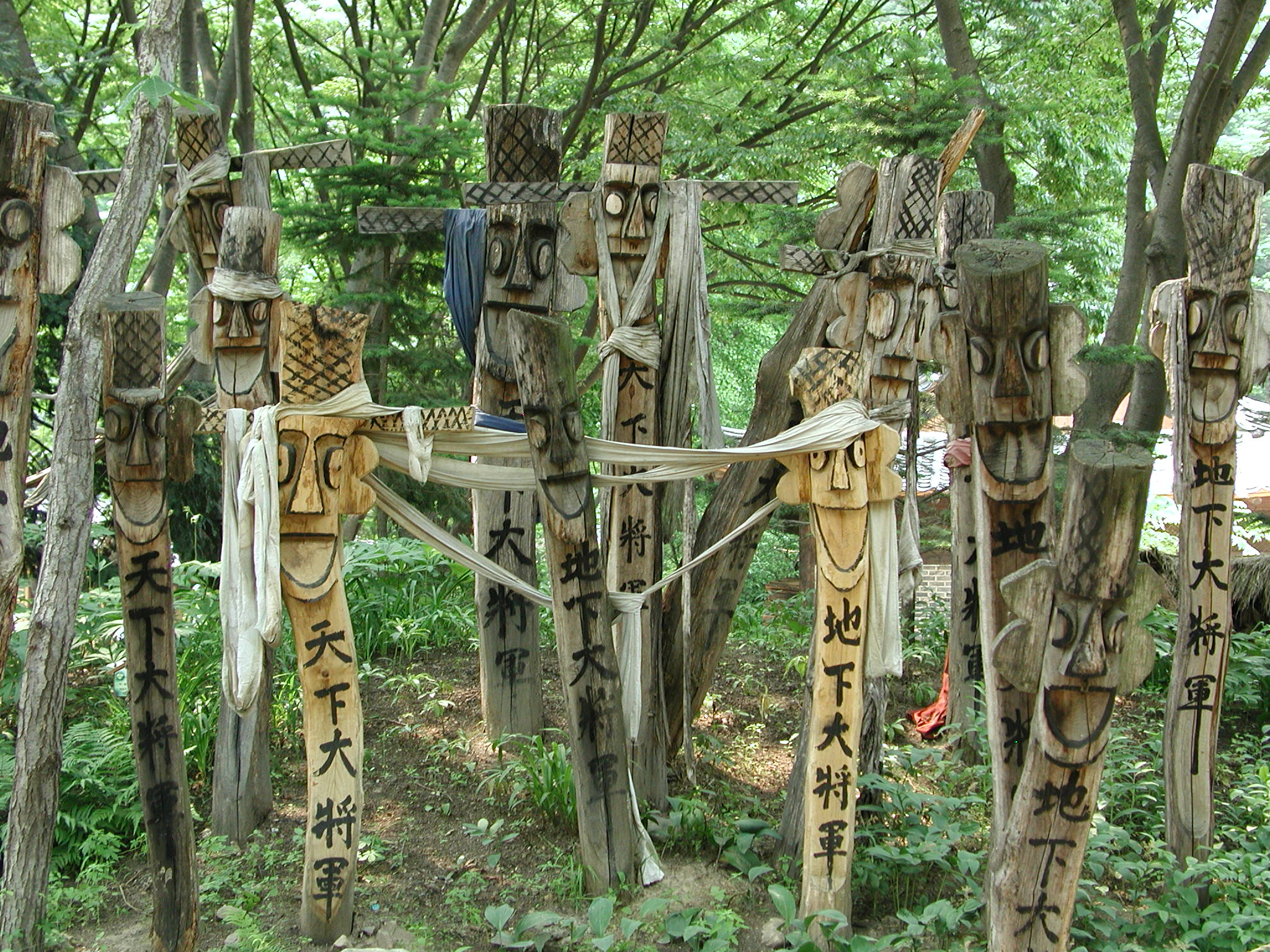
Jangseungs at the Korean Folk Village near Seoul.

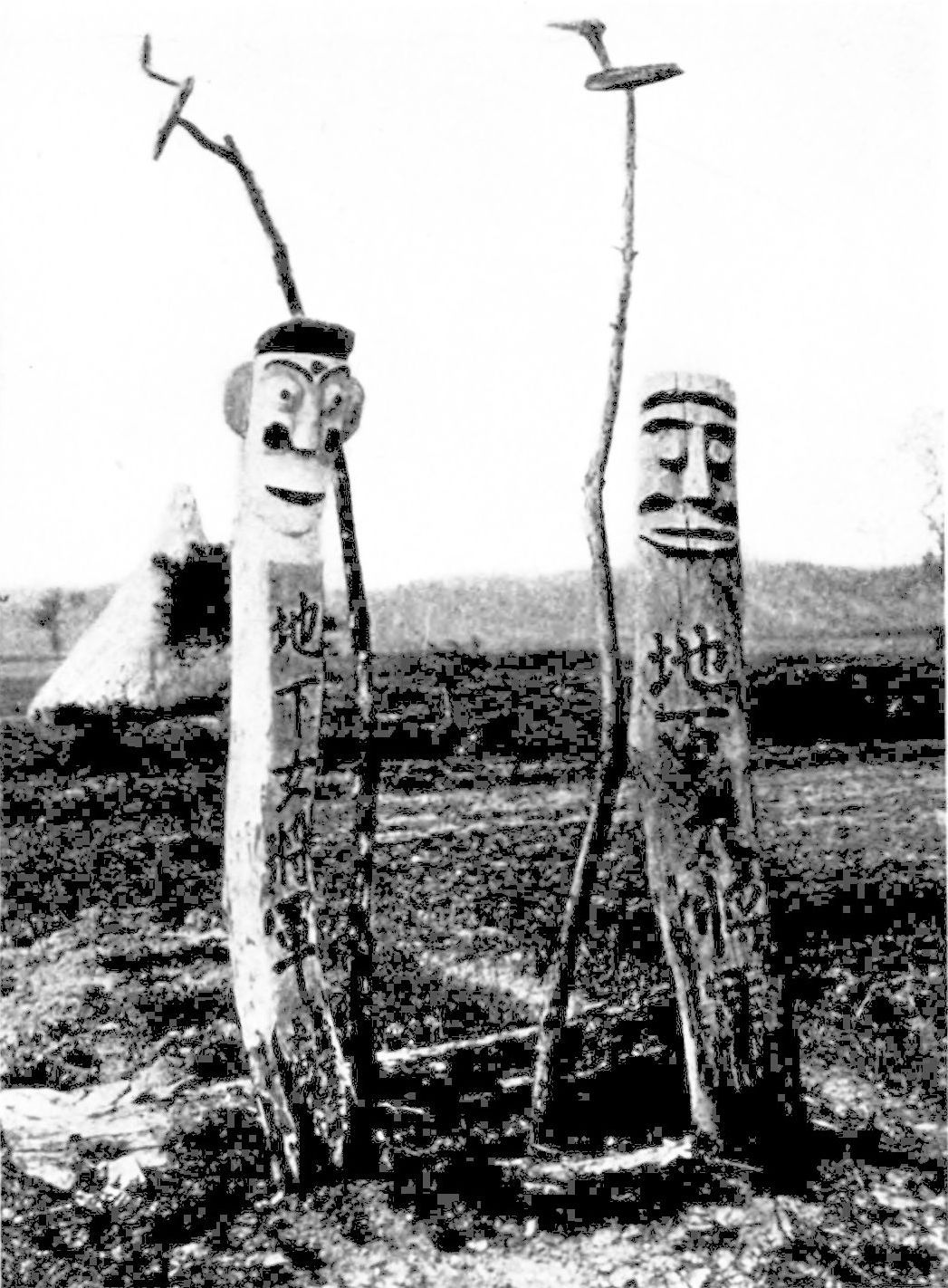
"Village devil posts" (jangseung) as described in The passing of Korea (1906) by the American Protestant missionary Homer Bezaleel Hulbert.

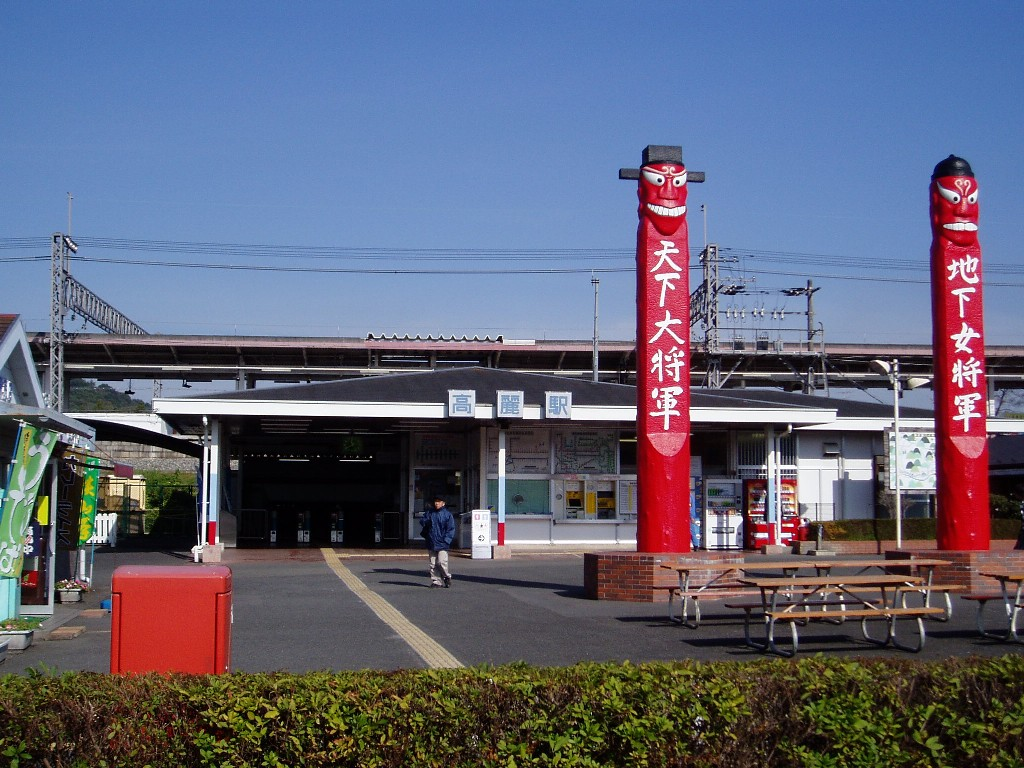
A wooden pair of jangseungs or Shōgunhyō found in Koma station, Japan.

== See also ==
- Dol hareubang
- Sotdae
- Korean shamanism
- Ceremonial pole
- Religion in Korea
- Seonangdang
