= Gasin faith =

Household deities in Korean shamanism

- Hangul: 가신신앙
- Hanja: 家神信仰
- Revised Romanization: Gasinsinang
- McCune–Reischauer: Kasinsinang

Gasin faith (Korean: 가신신앙; Hanja: 家神信仰; lit. 'household deity faith') refers to belief and rituals surrounding household deities in Korean shamanism. These deities, called gasin, are believed to protect the various objects (such as jangdok) and rooms of the house.

== Joryeong faith ==
The faith of Joryeong is the deification of one's ancestors. The earliest mention of the faith is in the Samguk Sagi, a Medieval Korean history book, which mentions the 'golden chest' of Kim Alji, the first member of the Gyeongju Kim clan. This bears resemblance to modern ancestor worship. In the modern Honam region in southwest Korea, Koreans keep a large pot in the house, filled with rice. This is called the Jeseok Ogari, and holds rice. The Jeseok Ogari is accompanied with Mom Ogari, which are smaller potteries. The name of the ancestor or rice is put in the Mom Ogari. In the Yeongnam region, Jeseok Ogari and Mom Ogari is called Sejon Danji and Josang Dangsegi. In festivals and birthdays, the family holds a jesa to the Jeseok Ogari and Mom Ogaris. In the jesa, the family prays for good harvests and prosperity. Curiously, the Joryeong faith seems to be based on a matriarchic entity called 'Josang Halmae', or 'Grandmother Ancestor'.

== Samsin faith ==
Samsin is the goddess of childbirth. Her entity was believed to be bound to the Samsin Danji, a pot kept in the inner wing of the house. The pot was filled with rice, then covered in paper and sealed with a knot tied counterclockwise. However, some households perform Geongung Samsin, or the act of honoring Samsin only in the mind. The Samsin was given Jesas every festival or birthday, and also seven and thirty-seven days after delivery. When someone is pregnant or has given delivery, the room holding the Samsin Danji was sealed with ropes. The faith of Samsin is strongest in Jeju Island.

== Seongju faith ==
Seongjusin (성주신; 城主神) is literally the 'Owner of the Castle'. As the deity of the actual house, he is one of the most common and most famous Gasin. In Jeollanamdo, the Seongjudok, or the pottery in which Seongjusin was considered to dwell, was filled with barley every spring and rice every autumn. However, in Jeollabukdo, the people practiced Tteunseongju, or worshipping Seongjusin only in thoughts. In other regions, Seongjusin was mostly believed to embody a piece of paper, which was attached to the central pillar. Every birthday or festival, a Jesa was done for Seongjusin, where housewives prayed for abundance and peace. Seongjusin was worshipped with other Gasins; however, when a new family was formed, or when a family moved to another residence, Seongjusin was for a time the only Gasin worshipped. Seongjusin is generally considered to be the greatest of the Gasin. The gut dedicated to him is one of the most famous, and he is believed to guard the eldest male member of the family.

== Jowang faith ==
Jowangshin (조왕신; 竈王神) is the goddess of fire and the hearth in Korean shamanism. As the goddess of the hearth, the rituals dedicated to her were generally kept alive by housewives. She is no longer the subject of worship, but still remains one of the most famous Korean deities.

== Teoju and Cheolyung faith ==
Teojushin (터주신; 터主神) is the patron of the ground on which the house is built in the Gashin cult of Korea. She is also known as Jishin (地神), or 'earth goddess'.

== Eopjanggun faith ==
Eopsin (업신; 業神) is the goddess of the storage and wealth in Korean mythology and shamanism. She is one of the Gasin, or deities that protect the house. However, unlike other Gasin, who were believed to embody pots, paper, and other inanimate objects, Eopsin is special in that she appears in an animal form. This is because Koreans considered snakes and weasels, who ate mice and rats, holy.

== Munsin faith ==
Munshin (문신; 門神; lit. 'Door god'), known in the southernly Jeju Island as Munjeon (문전; 門前) is the god of the door in Korean shamanism. The worship of Munshin is strongest in Jeju Island, where Munshin (known as Munjeon) is one of the most-worshipped deities; however, the worship of Munshin also exists in the mainland.

== Cheuksin faith ==
Cheuksin (측신; 廁神) is the toilet goddess of Korean mythology. Unlike better-known household deities such as Jowangshin, god of the hearth, her worship forms a minor part of the Gasin cult.

She is believed to reside in the outhouse.

== Other deities ==
- Nulgupjisin, god of grain
- Sosamsin, god of cowbirth
