= Dokkaebi bangmangi =

Korean folktale

Dokkaebi bangmangi (Korean: 도깨비 방망이; lit. 'The Goblins’ Club') is a Korean folktale that tells the story of a good woodcutter who comes into possession of goblin’s club and becomes rich, and an evil woodcutter who acts greedily and ends up getting punished. The story is both a sinidam, in which a goblin appears and influences the narrative, and a mobangdam containing a warning to those who copy others with bad intentions.

== History ==
The plot featuring a good person in coming up against an evil antagonist was found in Heungbujeon (흥부전 The Tale of Heungbu). A well-known folktale in Korea, Dokkaebi bangmangi is recorded in around 30 different versions in key oral folktale sourcebooks including Hanguk gubi munhak daegye (한국구비문학대계 Outlines of Korean Oral Literature).

== Plot ==
A good woodcutter, on his way to cut wood, picked up some ginkgo nuts. He planned to give them in turn to his grandfather, his grandmother, his parents, his siblings, his wife and his children, leaving the last ones for himself. Just then, it suddenly started raining, so the woodcutter took shelter in a log cabin. Inside, he found some goblins having a party. They were banging a club, drinking and eating, and the woodcutter, feeling hungry, took out the ginkgo nut he had just picked up and bit into it. The goblins were startled at the sound of his biting, and ran away. The woodcutter picked up their club, and became a rich man. When his neighbor, an evil woodcutter, heard what had happened, he tried to become rich himself, in exactly the same way. But, unlike the good woodcutter, he tried to eat all the ginkgo nuts he picked up. Then, the evil woodcutter went into the goblins’ cabin and bit into a ginkgo nut. But when the goblins heard the sound this time, they gave the evil woodcutter a good beating, thinking he was the man who had tricked them.

=== Variations ===
The good and evil woodcutters are sometimes presented as brothers rather than neighbors. Meanwhile, different versions describe different punishments for the evil woodcutter at the hands of the goblins. These involving stretching out parts of his body: in some versions, he has his arms and legs stretched longer; in others, the object of lengthening is his penis, showing a partial departure from moral lessons towards the pursuit of entertainment.

== Features and significance ==
Dokkaebi bangmangi not only emphasizes morality by featuring an evil character in contrast with its good protagonist; it also highlights the latter’s filial piety. When the good woodcutter picks up the ginkgo nuts, he plans to give them, in turn, to his grandparents, then his parents, while the evil woodcutter tries to keep all his nuts for himself. This emphasis on good and filially pious deeds lends Dokkaebi bangmangi a didactic character. It also contains a negative perception of imitating others.

While many Korean goblin tales describe the experiences of protagonists who meet goblins one-to-one, Dokkaebi bangmangi presents the goblins as a group, while clearly demonstrating their powers through the treasure that is their club. In this respect, Dokkaebi bangmangi can be considered a typical example of a goblin story narrated in a folktale style. It features vivid embodiments of goblins as imagined according to a folktale-based worldview.

== Other ==
In addition to Dokkaebi bangmangi, the story Hokburi yeonggam (혹부리 영감 The Old Man with a Lump) also tells a story of a protagonist becoming rich after meeting a goblin. The latter tale shows similar narrative content to the former, describing how the protagonist, the old man, receives riches after giving his lump to a goblin, but how another old man with a lump, who tries to become rich himself by copying the first, actually ends up with a second lump. But while Dokkaebi bangmangi emphasizes the filial piety of its protagonist and describes him coming into possession of their club after watching their party, and without actually talking to them, the protagonist in Hokburi yeonggam talks with the goblin while receiving his treasure, and the story does not place strong emphasis on his personality.

The term dokkaebi bangmangi (“goblin’s club”) is widely used in Korea, and appears in Korean dictionaries with the definition “a club that makes wishes come true.”
