= Korean virgin ghost =

Ghost from Korean folklore

Korean virgin ghosts (Korean: 처녀귀신; Hanja: 處女鬼神; RR: cheonyeo-gwisin) are the spirit of a young, unmarried woman in Korean folklore and urban legend. She is also known as a malmyeong, sonmalmyeong, or songaksi.

== Origin ==
In early traditional Korea, women were brought up with the ideologies that their life's sole purpose shall be serving their father, husband, and children. It was believed that a woman gets lifelong resentment and cannot move into the afterlife if she dies before fulfilling her responsibilities. It was considered that to them dying a virgin is equivalent to their life being meaningless. Thus, in the folklore, unmarried young girls after death become a han and turns into evil spirits. They mainly attach to young girls of their age, harassing and harming them. They may also ruin the family and so are specially enlisted as a vassal in their household. A small shelf is hung on the wall in one corner, and a small wooden box is enshrined on it, or the spirit is enshrined in a door gap.

== Appearance ==
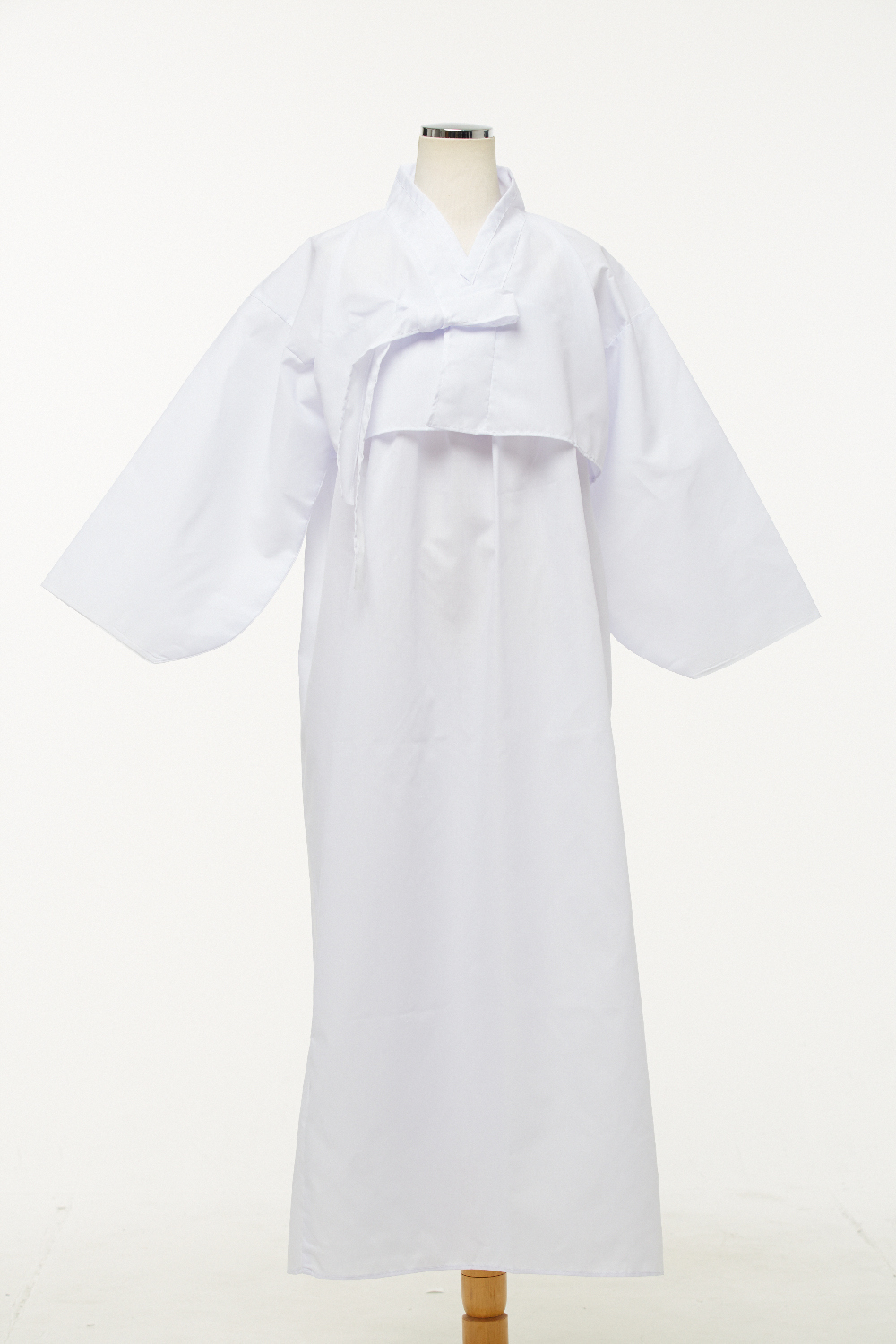
Sobok, a white hanbok (the traditional mourning attire)

The spirit is often depicted as a woman wearing a white hanbok, called sobok (소복), the traditional white mourning attire with their hair down. Traditionally, the married women tied their hair up and since the spirit died unmarried, they put their hair loose and down. The spirit has a pale white face with dark circles and a small amount of blood drips from the side of her mouth. Sometimes, depicted as shedding tears of blood or is even covered in blood. Originally, however, the Korean virgin ghosts were considered to be indistinguishable from humans because of their neat appearance.

== Activities ==
Korean virgin ghosts are mainly known for haunting abandoned buildings, especially in hospitals, schools, bathrooms, cemeteries, lakes, dark country roads or wooded areas. They start their act around midnight which continues until dawn. They almost always have long hair covering their faces, with sullen features, dressed in white. It is believed that people will know that they are in the presence of a virgin ghost when there is a sudden change in temperature and the wind direction. They haunt with anger and revenge to those who caused them harm and are also known to haunt newly married couples. They are considered to bring illnesses and accidents.

== Myths ==
Since ancient times, it has been thought that the resentment was very deep when a virgin died. There is a myth that if anyone gets possessed by a virgin ghost, they will harbor strong resentment or that they will not be able to get married. For this reason, in the old days, for fear that a virgin would die and becomes a ghost, dolls emphasizing the male genitalia were made of straw and put in a coffin or dolls dressed in men's clothes and buried upside down. Then thorns were placed around the coffin and buried. The reason for putting a male doll emphasizing the genitals in a coffin or wearing men's clothes is to comfort them for making contact with men even after they die, and burying the coffin upside down is to block the virgin ghost from coming out thoroughly. This part shows how much the fear of virgin ghosts in the civilian world was overwhelming in the past.

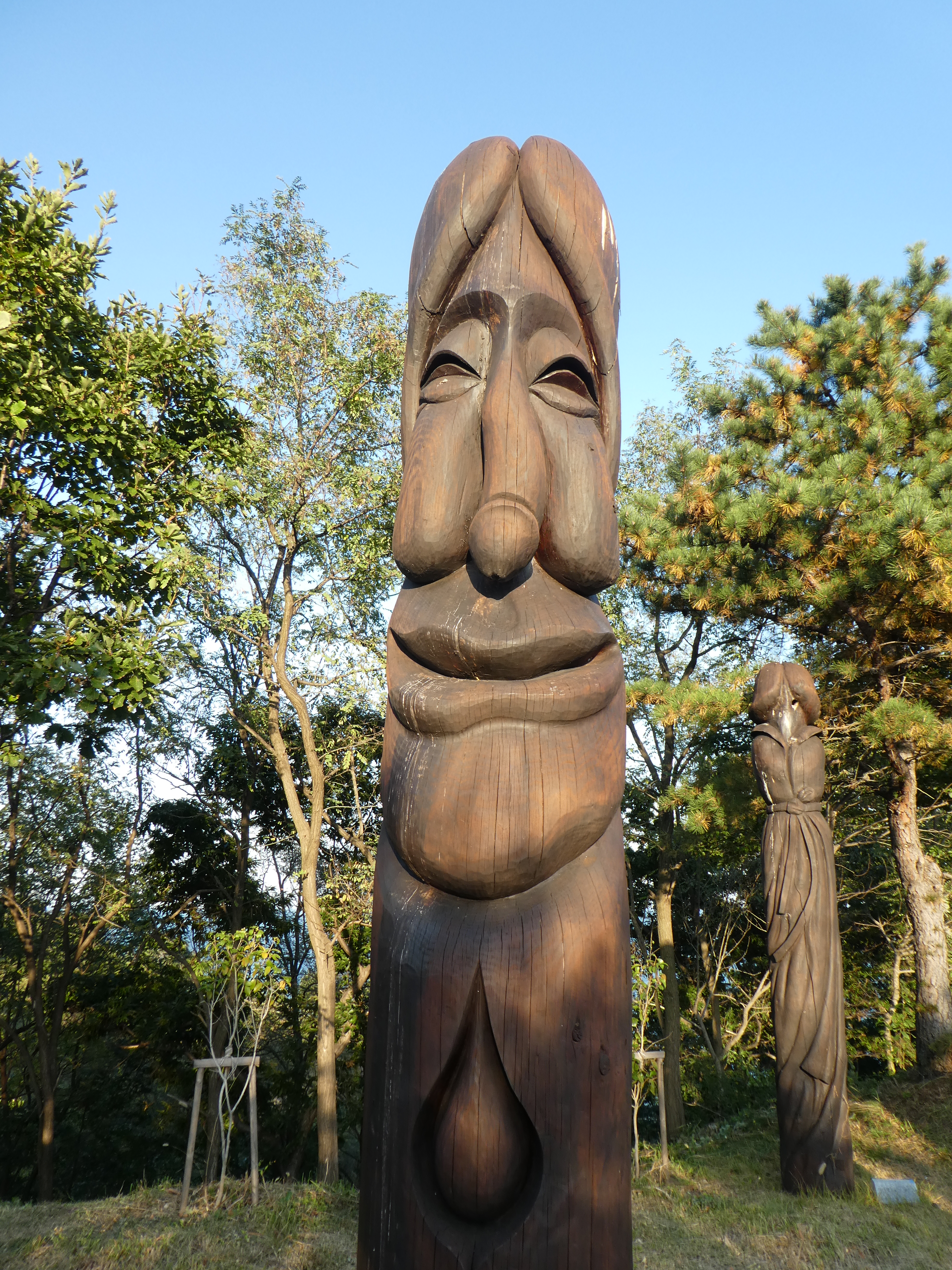
Haesindang Park, Samcheok, South Korea

There is also the male equivalent of the Korean virgin ghost known as the Korean bachelor ghost (총각귀신, chonggakgwishin). It is considered that the Korean virgin ghost can only be eliminated by performing the ritual of exorcism or by “soul weddings” (영혼결혼식, yeonghongyeolhonsig) which is a wedding held for the cheonyeo ("virgin") and chonggak ("bachelor") “couple” so that their souls may rest in peace. Virgin ghosts can also be made to move to afterlife by traditionally erecting phallic statues.

Some of these statues can still be found in Haesindang Park, located in Samcheok. Shrines for the Korean virgin ghost may feature phallic carvings and sculptures, and will have annual rites offering food and drink to the souls.

== In popular culture ==
In the classic Janghwa Hongryeon jeon, which is famous for featuring a virgin ghost, the appearance of Hongryeon in front of a governor of a town is described as “A beautiful woman dressed in a green jacket and a scarlet skirt came in quietly and bowed.” The ghost looked so neat and decent that it is not surprising for the governor to say, "Are you a human or a demon, tell me the truth!" Also, the horror of a virgin ghost who died with a grudge is vividly described in Geumgyepildam (금계필담; 金溪筆談), a collection of tales written by Seo Yu-young in 1873.

In popular culture and media, a similar appearance of a Korean virgin ghost (cheonyeogwisin) can be found in The Ring Virus (1999) which is a film based on an earlier Japanese horror movie.

The story of the Korean virgin ghost (cheonyogwisin) has been adapted in contemporary Korean dramas as well. Dramas like Oh My Ghost, Arang and the Magistrate, Hey Ghost, Let's Fight and a popular summertime TV series, The Country of Legends, revolve around virgin ghosts.

An old movie named Cheonyeogwisin was released in 1967 starring Park Seong-ja (박성자) and Lee Ye-chun (이예춘), directed by Shim Woo-seop (심우섭). Scent of a Ghost directed by Jun-hak Lee, is a horror romance about the struggle to exorcise a virgin ghost in a shabby Mugunghwa Villa that is about to be reconstructed. Released in 1986, the movie Woman's Wail (여곡성, Yeogokseong) is a historical horror film featuring a virgin ghost and is considered one of the most famous Korean horror films of all time. There is also a remake of the movie called The Wrath (여곡성, Yeogokseong), which featured Seo Young-hee and Son Na-eun. Also, Nangjahan (낭자한) is a 1974 horror film directed by Park Yoon-gyo, a regular director of horror films in the 1970s and 1980s. Set in the Joseon period, it is a story of a virgin ghost with loose hair, and a woman who died with a grudge appears as a ghost and scolds her enemies. Moreover, in the drama Guardian: The Lonely and Great God, Park Kyung-hye left a strong impression on the small screen as a virgin ghost who wanders around Gucheon and follows Ji Eun-tak (Kim Go-eun), the 'Goblin's bride'.

Irang is a play based on the story of General Nam Yi, an unfortunate figure who was executed on charges of treason. The play is about the love story of General Nam Yi who can see spirits and Irang, a virgin ghost who loves him.

A fusion horror Korean traditional music concert Gwigogsanjang Linyueol (귀곡산장 리뉴얼, "Renewal") addresses scary legends including stories of cheonyeogwisin (처녀귀신). The performers played music related to the episodes of the Korean virgin ghost.

== See also ==
- Gwisin
- White Lady (ghost)
