= 妖怪 =

妖怪 ("strange apparition") may refer to:

- Yaoguai, a supernatural entity in Chinese folklore
- Yogoe, supernatural entity in Korean folklore
- Yōkai, a supernatural entity in Japanese folklore
