= Duduri =

Deity in Korean folklore

- Wood spirit
- Other names

Korean name
- Hangul: 두두리
- RR: duduri
- MR: tuduri
- Venerated in: Korean shamanism
- Major cult center: Gyeongju
- Symbol: Wooden statue
- Ethnic group: Koreans

Duduri (Korean: 두두리), also known as Dudueul (두두을), was a wood spirit (木神) worshipped in the Gyeongju region of Korea. It was also called Mokrang (木郞). Duduri appears in records from the Goryeo dynasty. A later source says that people had worshipped the spirit since the time of Bihyeongrang in the Silla dynasty. Worship of Duduri later declined. Some scholars consider Duduri an early form of the dokkaebi in Korean folklore.

== Origins ==
The name Duduri is Korean and was written in Chinese characters as 豆豆里 or 豆豆乙. Its original meaning is uncertain. The Sinjeung Dongguk Yeoji Seungnam (新增東國輿地勝覽), published in 1530, records that people in Gyeongju worshipped a spirit called Mokrang (木郞), also known as Duduri. They held rites for this spirit at Wanggasu (王家藪), a forest ten li south of Gyeongju. The book says that Duduri had been widely worshipped since the time of Bihyeongrang in the Silla dynasty.

Folklorist Kang Eun-hae describes Duduri as an earlier form of the Dokkaebi in Korean folklore.

== Historical accounts ==
Duduri appears in several records from the Goryeo dynasty. The Goryeosa (History of Goryeo) tells of Yi Ŭimin, a military leader who held power from 1183 to 1196. Yi came from Gyeongju and had risen from the slave class. He kept a shrine to Duduri in his home and prayed to the spirit for protection. According to the story, Duduri cried and told Yi that it could no longer protect him. Yi lost power and was killed soon afterwards.

Another account in the Goryeosa dates to 1231, during the first Mongol invasion of Korea. A report from Gyeongju claimed that five spirits called Mokrang had come to fight the Mongols. The spirits asked the Goryeo court to send weapons and horses. Ch'oe U sent an official with pictures of soldiers and horses as an offering to the spirits. The account says that the spirits failed to stop the Mongols.

Historian Yun Seong-jae suggests that Duduri lost much of its importance after the fall of the powerful men who worshipped it.

== In popular culture ==
In the 2003–2004 KBS historical drama Age of Warriors, a shamanistic character named Dudueul, played by Jeon Moo-song, appears as an advisor to Yi Ŭimin.
