= Yoon Joo =

South Korean actress (born 1989)

- 윤주
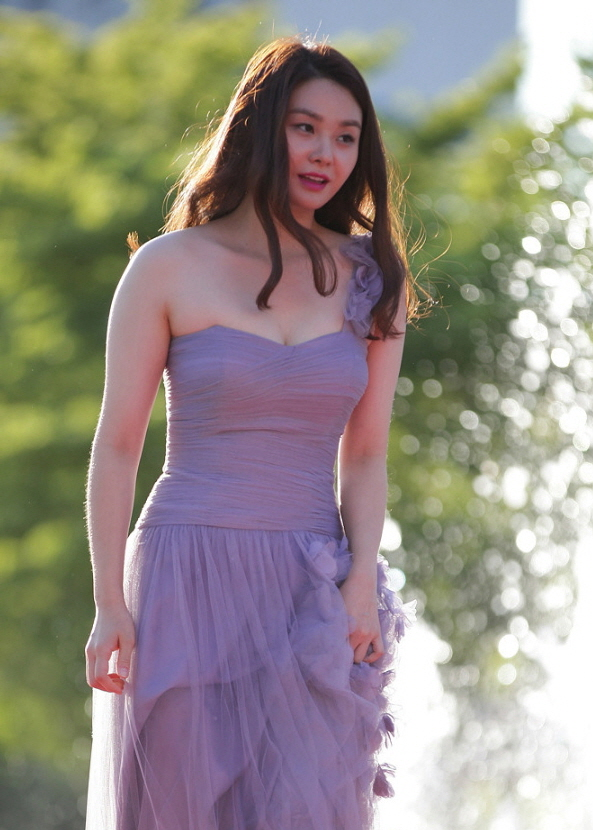
- Yoon at the opening ceremony of the 19th Bucheon International Fantastic Film Festival
- Born: December 4, 1989 (age 36); Seoul, South Korea
- Occupation: Actress
- Years active: 2010–present
- Agent: L July Entertainment

Korean name
- Hangul: 윤주
- RR: Yun Ju
- MR: Yun Chu

Yoon Joo (Korean: 윤주, born December 4, 1989) is a South Korean actress.

== Biography ==
Yoon was a 3rd Dan taekwondo player until middle school, when she ended her sport training due to an injury. She then attended Anyang Arts High School to learn acting. After graduating from Suwon Women's University with a degree in acting, Yoon got her first role in the 2010 theater play Catch him. In the same year, Yoon played the main role in the movie Bad Blood, after she was introduced to the audition by a person who worked with her on the play Catch him. However, the film was not released for two years after filming, during which Yoon struggled to make money while work on various part-time jobs such as serving in a coffee shop to move out of her parents' house who were against her career choice. In November 2012, Bad Blood was released and her performance received positive reviews. The Seoul Shinmun evaluated her performance, saying, "Yoon's strong acting is impressive as she plays a shocking and complex character in her debut which attracted our attention." Fashion magazine Arena Homme + named Yoon as the 2013 promising rookie actress.

== Filmography ==
=== Television series ===
Year	Title	Role	Notes	Ref.
2011	Insu, the Queen Mother	Se-seon	Appeared on the 9th episode	
2015	Kill Me, Heal Me	Jennifer	Special appearance	
2015	Cheo Yong 2		Special appearance	
2016	Bring It On, Ghost		Special appearance	

=== Film ===
Year	Title	Role	Ref.
2012	Bad Blood	In-seon	
2012	Whatcha Wearin'?	Hyeon-seung's company employee 4	
2015	Wonderful Nightmare	Ji-min	
2015	Untouchable Lawman	Girlfriend-to-be	
2015	Deep Trap	Soo-jeong - Special appearance	
2015	You Call It Passion	Leisure control person	
2016	I'm Feng	Female	
2016	A Break Alone	Shi-yeon	
2017	The Outlaws	Hong-seok's fiancée - Special appearance	
2018	The Pension	Seung-joo	
2019	Friday the 13th: The Conspiracy Begins	Yoon Cheong-ha	
2019	Judgment Night	Yoon-joo	
2019	DMZ: RELOAD	Yoon Cheong-ha	

=== Theater ===
Year	Title	Role	Ref.
2010	Catch Him (그놈을 잡아라)	Seon-hee	
2010	Trip (여행)	Han Song-yi	
2013	Blow Romance (불어라 로맨스)	Jeon So-young	

=== Music video appearances ===
"Goodbye, Universe" by Kwon Young-chan (2014)

== Awards and nominations ==
Year	Award	Category	Nominated work	Results	Ref.
2016	37th Blue Dragon Film Awards	Best New Actress	A Break Alone	Nominated	
