= Dokkaebi =

Creatures from Korean folklore

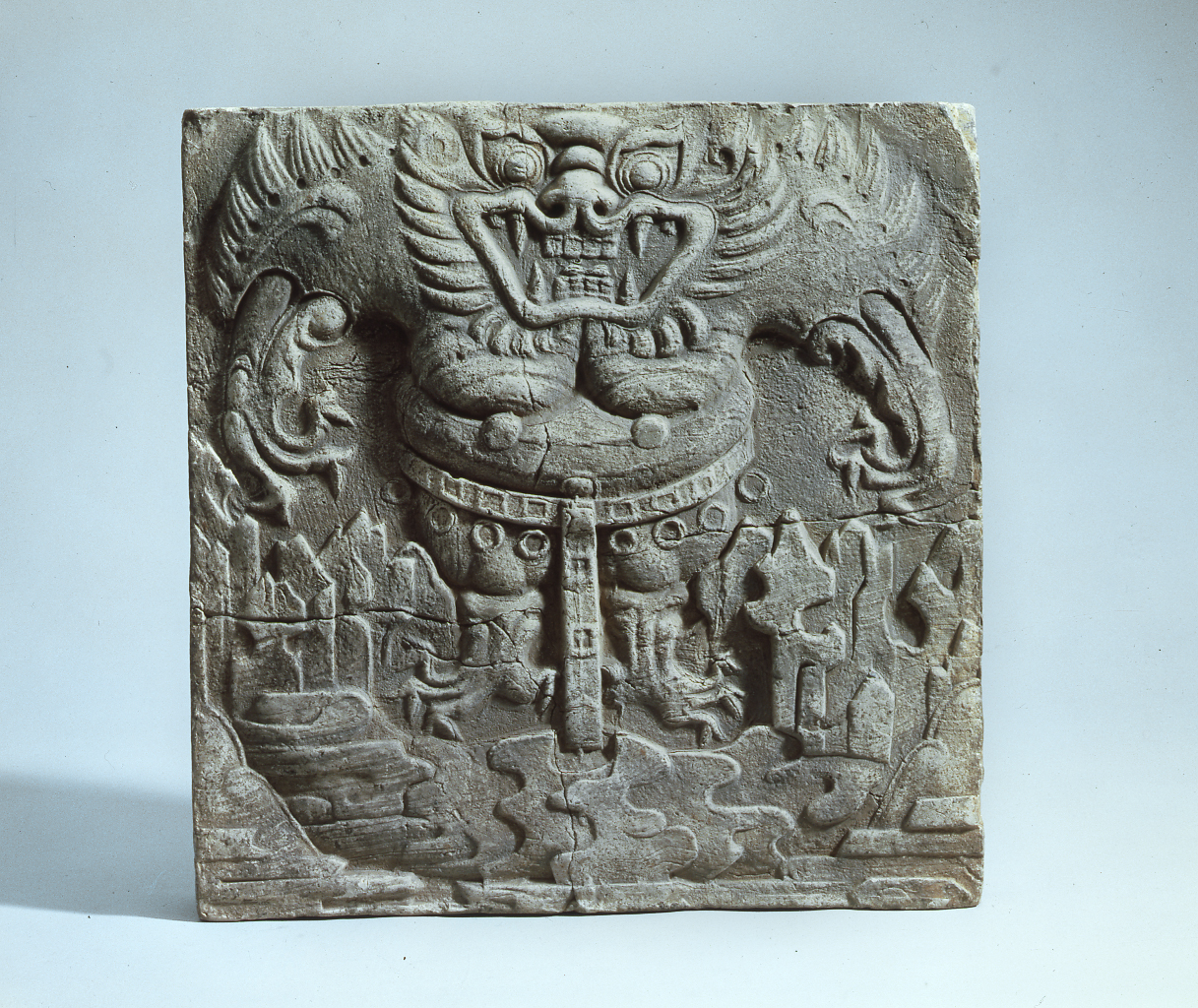
- Dokkaebi patterned tiles from Oe-ri, Buyeo dating back to the Baekje period

Korean name
- Hangul: 도깨비
- RR: dokkaebi
- MR: tokkaebi

Dokkaebi (Korean: 도깨비) are legendary creatures from Korean mythology and folklore. Dokkaebi, also known as "Korean ogres", are nature deities or spirits possessing extraordinary powers and abilities that are used to interact with humans, at times playing tricks on them and at times helping them. Legends describe different dokkaebi in many forms and beings with a thousand faces, and dokkaebi often wear hanbok.

== Origins ==
The earliest known documentation of dokkaebi is in the Silla-era tale of "Lady Dohwa and Bachelor Bihyeong" from the Memorabilia of the Three Kingdoms compiled during the Goryeo period. Dokkaebi are featured in many folk tale anthologies compiled during the Joseon period.

== Characteristics ==
Dokkaebi are different from deities, divinities, spirits or ghosts, called gwishin (귀신) in Korean, in that they are not formed by the death of a human being, but rather by the spiritual possession of an inanimate object such as old discarded household tools like brooms, or objects stained with human blood.

The physical appearance of the dokkaebi is presented in many different ways and has varied by different time periods, but they have always been depicted as fearsome and awe-inspiring. The most common depiction of them is based on ancient roof tiles with dokkaebi patterns.

Different versions of the dokkaebi mythology assign different attributes to them. In some cases, they are considered harmless but nevertheless mischievous, usually playing pranks on people or challenging wayward travelers to a ssireum (Korean wrestling) match for the right to pass. Dokkaebi are extremely skilled at wrestling and cannot be beaten unless their right side is exploited. In other tales, dokkaebi only have one leg, so one should hook their leg and push them to win.

Dokkaebi fire is a glimmering light or tall blue flames that herald the appearance of dokkaebi.

Dokkaebi possess magical items, such as the dokkaebi hat called the dokkaebi gamtu (도깨비 감투), which grants the wearer the ability of invisibility, and the dokkaebi magic club called the dokkaebi bangmangi (도깨비 방망이), which can summon things and act functionally as a magic wand. Dokkaebi are said to like buckwheat jelly (memilmuk) and red bean rice cakes, which are traditionally offered as foods during dokkaebi gosa (도깨비 고사).

== Abilities ==
It is believed that dokkaebi have immense supernatural powers, can bring good harvests, big catches and great fortunes to humans, and are defenders against evil spirits. Depending on the region's traditional folklore, some traditional practices are held to appeal to dokkaebi to bring good luck to humans and other practices are done to chase away dokkaebi, who are thought to be the causes of bad luck that brings fires and contagious diseases. In Jeju Island, the Durin-gut healing ceremony for mental illnesses is said to drive away the dokkaebi from the patient, similar to driving away the bad energy from a person.

== Legends ==
Many Korean legends have dokkaebi featured in them. In several, dokkaebi play pranks on mortals or punish them because of their evil deeds. One such tale describes an old man who lived alone on a mountain. One day, a dokkaebi visited his house. Surprised, the kind old man gave the dokkaebi an alcoholic beverage and they become friends. The dokkaebi visited the old man often and they had long conversations together, but one day, the man took a walk by himself in the woods near the river. He discovered that his reflection looked like the dokkaebi. The old man was afraid as he realized that he was gradually becoming that creature. The man made a plan to prevent himself from becoming a dokkaebi and invited the creature to his house. He asked, "What are you most afraid of?" and the dokkaebi answered, "I'm afraid of blood. What are you afraid of?" The man pretended to be frightened and said, "I'm afraid of money. That's why I live in the mountains by myself." The next day, the old man killed a cow and poured its blood all over his house. The dokkaebi, with shock and great anger, ran away and said, "I'll be back with your greatest fear!" The next day, the dokkaebi brought bags of money and threw it to the old man. After that, dokkaebi never came back and the old man became the richest person in the town.

== Types ==
Although dokkaebis have no set form, some people divide them into types. These are some common types:

- Cham dokkaebi (참도깨비; lit. 'true dokkaebi'): A mischievous dokkaebi. Contrast with Gae Dokkaebi.
- Gae dokkaebi (개도깨비; lit. 'dog dokkaebi'): Evil dokkaebi. Contrast with Cham Dokkaebi.
- Gaksi dokkaebi (각시도깨비; lit. 'maiden dokkaebi') and chonggak dokkaebi (총각도깨비; lit. 'bachelor dokkaebi'): Dokkaebi, known to attract humans.
- Go dokkaebi (고도깨비; lit. 'high dokkaebi'): Dokkaebi known to be good at fighting and handling weapons, especially arrows.
- Kim Seobang dokkaebi (김서방 도깨비; lit. 'Mr. Kim Dokkaebi'): A dumb dokkaebi that looks like a farmer.
- Nat dokkaebi (낮도깨비; lit. 'day dokkaebi'): Unlike other dokkaebi, these appear during the daylight. They are known to give dokkaebi gamtus to humans.
- Oedari dokkaebi (외다리도깨비; lit. 'one-legged dokkaebi'): A one-legged dokkaebi that likes to play Ssireum.
- Oenun dokkaebi (외눈도깨비; lit. 'one-eyed dokkaebi'): A one-eyed dokkaebi that eats a lot.

== Media ==
Based on the folktale of dokkaebi, the South Korean cable network tvN showcased a television series called Guardian: The Lonely and Great God (쓸쓸하고 찬란하神 – 도깨비) starring Gong Yoo as title role and written by Kim Eun-sook, a notable writer in the industry. It earned 3rd place in the nationwide television ratings.

Dokebi is a killable monster in the MMORPG Ragnarok Online, a South Korean game franchise whose first iteration began in 2002. Players of the original game hunted this mob for its very low chance of dropping an item worth a lot of in-game currency - gold bar. The dokebi mob has maintained a nostalgic presence in consecutive releases of this game, as it has changed over the decades.

In 2017, K-pop girlgroup CLC released a song called Hobgoblin (도깨비), which lyrics seem to be casting a spell through seducing so it holds the attention of the listener. The formerly cute group brought a darker and sexier concept, as well a fresh EDM Trap sonority. The song succeeded at bringing attention and performed greatly overseas.

In 2018, a novel called Omniscient Reader's Viewpoint by Sing Shong came out, in which the dokkaebi play a big role as antagonists.

There is also a reference to a dokkaebi in a video game called Tom Clancy's Rainbow Six Siege. Grace "Dokkaebi" Nam is an operator. Her nickname is a reference to her ability to tamper with the opposing team's phones, by causing them to vibrate, revealing their location. She can also infiltrate CCTV cameras and observe the enemy.

Sujin, a non-binary dokkaebi, is a character in the novel Dragon Pearl by Yoon Ha Lee.

In September 2020, K-pop boy group A.C.E released a song called Goblin: Favorite Boys (도깨비). In Korean fairy tales, traditional goblins like to wrestle with humans. Using that, their choreographer found a way for them to use traditional Korean wrestling in their choreography as well as in their clothing styling and set imagery.

An upcoming video game that prominently features dokkaebi, titled DokeV, and developed by South Korean video game developer Pearl Abyss, is currently in development as of August 2021.

In August 2021, the K-pop boy group Stray Kids made a dokkaebi-themed video for their comeback song "Thunderous".

In March 2023, the K-pop boy group Xikers debuted with their song "Tricky House" (도깨비집) and first introduced their dokkaebi related lore with a dokkaebi-themed MV.

The dokkaebi appear in the Mickey Mouse Funhouse episode "HALT, Tiger". They reside in the Shadow Mountain part of the Land of Myth and Legend.

Dokkaebi are featured prominently in the 2025 animated film KPop Demon Hunters.

== See also ==
- Duduri
- Heungbu and Nolbu
