= Bring It On, Ghost =

South Korean television series

- Promotional poster
- Hangul: 싸우자 귀신아
- Hanja: 싸우자 鬼神아
- Lit.: Let's Fight, Ghost
- RR: Ssauja gwisina
- MR: Ssauja kwisina
- Genre: Horror; Mystery; Romantic comedy
- Based on: Let's Fight, Ghost by Im In-seu (Im Man-seob)
- Developed by: Studio Dragon
- Written by: Lee Dae-il
- Directed by: Park Joon-hwa; Myung Hyun-woo
- Starring: Ok Taec-yeon; Kim So-hyun; Kwon Yul
- Country of origin: South Korea
- Original language: Korean
- No. of episodes: 16

Production
- Executive producers: Choi Kyung-sook; Park Ji-young; Song Byung-joon
- Producers: Yoon Hyun-gi; Lee Se-hee
- Cinematography: Park Jae-hong
- Editors: Oh Dong-hee; Kim Jin-seon
- Production companies: Creative Leaders Group 8; The Unicorn

Original release
- Network: tvN
- Release: July 11 – August 30, 2016

Bring It On, Ghost (Korean: 싸우자 귀신아; RR: Ssauja gwisina; lit. 'Let's Fight, Ghost') is a South Korean television series starring Ok Taec-yeon, Kim So-hyun and Kwon Yul. It is adapted from webtoon of the same name which was serialised on Naver from 2007 to 2010. The series aired on cable network tvN on Mondays and Tuesdays at 23:00 (KST) for 16 episodes from 11 July to 30 August 2016. The series was well-received domestically and internationally. It was ranked as the ninth most watched cable drama in Korea during 2016.

== Synopsis ==
Park Bong-pal (Ok Taec-yeon) has grown up with the ability to see ghosts. He uses his power to work as an exorcist, banishing ghosts in order to make enough money to undergo a procedure that will take his ability away. At a haunted high school, he encounters Kim Hyun-ji (Kim So-hyun) a feisty high school student who, because of a traffic accident, became a wandering spirit. Hyun-ji believes that Bong-pal might hold the secret as to why she is a spirit. In order to be freed from endlessly wandering the earth and be able to ascend to the next life, Hyun-ji convinces Bong-pal to let her move in, and the two become ghost fighting partners.

With Hyun-ji, Bong-pal finds that he can fight even stronger ghosts, but also learns that not all ghosts are malevolent. Working and living together, Bong-pal, a long time loner, finds himself falling in love with Hyun-ji, who returns his feelings. However, both are unaware that they are being stalked by an evil spirit that was the cause of Hyun-ji's accident, and is the reason Bong-pal can see ghosts.

== Cast ==
=== Main ===
- Ok Taec-yeon as Park Bong-pal
  - Lee Seung-woo as young Bong-pal

The male protagonist. Bong-pal is a 23-year-old Economics student and he lived with an exorcist. He can see and interact with ghosts, whom he beats up into leaving their haunts. Due to his ability, he grew up avoiding people and was always a loner before he met and fell in love with Hyun-ji.

- Kim So-hyun as Kim Hyun-ji

The female protagonist. A middle high-school student who, since a car accident when she was 19, has roamed the earth for five years as a wandering spirit. With no memory of her past, she is unable to move on. Discovering that Bong-pal may hold the secret to her past, she moves in with him and becomes his ghost-fighting partner. She can see how ghosts were killed, allowing her to help Bong-pal dispel them. Living and fighting, together and against each other, she falls in love with Bong-pal.

- Kwon Yul as Joo Hye-sung
  - Jang Ho-joon as young Hye-sung

The main antagonist. At 31, he is the youngest professor of veterinary medicine at Bong-pal's university. He has been possessed by a powerful evil spirit for so long that it is almost impossible to discern the difference between the two. Before possessing Hye-sung, the spirit had tried to possess the young Bong-pal, and the fragment of the spirit that remains in Bong-pal is the reason he can see ghosts. Fearing a ritual weapon that can destroy him and the spirit that possesses him, Hye-sung has stalked Bong-pal for years and was responsible for the death of his mother, a medium.

=== Supporting ===
==== People around Park Bong-pal ====
- Kim Sang-ho as Monk Myung-cheol

A 55-year-old Buddhist monk, he has been Bong-pal's spiritual protector since childhood.

- Kim Min-sang as Park Ji-hoon

Bong-pal's father. Bong-pal is estranged from his father, unaware that he has been trying to protect him.

- Son Eun-seo as Hong Myung-hee

Bong-pal's mother, a powerful medium, who died when Bong-pal was quite young.

==== Ghosts ====
- Lee Do-yeon as Oh Kyung-ja

The ghost of 32-year-old woman. Hyun-ji's friend, the two being ghosts together. Kyung-ja appears to be a "virgin ghost" common in Korean mythology, and follows handsome men around. We later on find out more about her back story.

==== Myungsung University ====
- Kang Ki-young as Choi Cheon-sang

A 26-year-old 3rd-year Physical Education student and the president of the university ghost-hunting club "Ghost Net".

- Lee David as Kim In-rang

A 25-year-old 3rd-year Computer and Information Science student and the vice-president of "Ghost Net".

- Baek Seo-yi as Lim Seo-yeon

A 25-year-old, she is a 4th-year Economics student on whom Bong-pal has a crush.

==== Extended ====
- Nam Kyung-min as Nurse Jung

A 27-year-old woman

- Yeon Ji-hae as Nurse Kim

A 24-year-old woman

- Yoon Seo-hyun as Detective Yang

A 46-year-old man, he is a sergeant of Mapo Police Station criminal case, who is highly suspicious of Hye-sung for his connections of multiple murder cases.

- Jung Ji-soon as Detective Kim

A 41-year-old man, he is the chief of Mapo Police Station criminal case

- Choi Min-geum
- Oh Ha-nui
- Seo Yoon-ah as Noh Hyun-joo
- Yoon Joo
- Kim Choo-wol
- Lee Jeong-hyuk
- Kwon Ban-seok
- Hyun Jeong-cheol
- Kim Ji-eun as Freshman Kim Ji-eun
- Yoon Sung-won
- Yeom Ji-hye
- Son Seung-hee
- Kim Hyo-myung as union club president
- Seo Kwang-jae as monk Myung-cheol's acupuncturist friend
- Seo Jeong-ha
- Lee Ye-rim
- Son Young-soon as dead child's grandmother
- Park Gyu-young as Lee Se-in
- Oh Eun-byul
- Kwon Ji-hwan
- Kim Sang-woo
- Lee Jin-mok
- Lee Min-sung
- Kwon Soon-joon
- Kang Min-ah as Kim Eun-sung
- Joo Boo-jin as guest house's grandmother
- Kim Do-yoon
- Park Geon-rak
- Choi Yoon-joon
- Kim Joon-won as detective
- Choi Soo-im as Hyun-min's younger brother
- Son Seon-geun
- Yook Mi-ra
- Park Geon
- Park Gwi-soon as monk
- Park Hyung-joon as doctor
- Yoon Hee-won as Hyun-ji's father
- Park Jae-hong
- Ha Min
- Yoo An
- Ahn Soo-bin
- Lee Han-joo
- Han Ji-woon
- Im Jae-geun
- Ri Min
- Jung Jong-hyun
- Kim Mi-hye
- Kim Hye-rim
- Jo Seon-mook
- Go Jin-young
- Lee Jae-soo
- Shin Dong-hoon
- Ahn Sung-geon
- Kang Ji-woo
- Lee Ho
- Choi Hyo-eun as Hyo-eun
- Kim So-yi
- Park Sung-gyun
- Kim Joo-young
- Park Dae-won
- Lee Dong-hee
- Jo Ah-jin
- Cha Min-hyuk
- Lee Jae-won
- Ahn Ye-eun
- Kim Soo-jeong
- Yang Ha-young

=== Special appearances ===
- Lee Se-young as ghost (Ep. 1)
- Choi Hong-man as ghost (Ep. 1)
- Shim Hyung-tak as teacher (Ep. 1, 5, 16)
- Woo Hyun as ghost (Ep. 1)
- Choi Go as a boy on the bus (Ep. 1)
- Lee Jung-eun as apartment's woman president (Ep. 2)
- Han Bo-reum as Miz (Ep. 3)
- Choi Dae-sung as sauna's owner (Ep. 4)
- Goo Bon-im as monk Myung-cheol's acquaintance (Ep. 5, 10–11, 15)
- Park Hyun-sook as Kim Eun-sung's mother (Ep. 7)
- Kim Ji-young as Kim In-rang's grandmother (Ep. 7)
- Choi Ji-na as Seo Jeong-geum – 48-year-old, Hyun-ji's mother (Ep. 7, 11)
- Park Choong-seon as national CSI's autopsy staff (Ep. 7, 10)
- Jin Yi-han as Hyun-min (Ep. 9, 10)
- Lee Soo-kyung as Shin Soo-kyung (Ep. 9, 10)
- Yoon Bong-gil as union club's secretary (Ep. 10)
- Kim Hee-won as detective (Ep. 12)
- Seo Hyun-jin as department store clerk (Ep. 13)
- Kwon Hyuk-soo as client (Ep. 16)
- Yoon Doo-joon as Goo Dae-young (Ep. 16)
- Kim Hyun-sook as shaman (Ep. 16)

== Production ==
In March 2016, tvN announced that they would be adapting and producing a drama version of Hey Ghost, Let's Fight, a popular 2007–2010 manhwa by Im In-seu, under the same title. On April 27, Kim So-hyun's agency confirmed that she would join the drama, with male lead Ok Taec-yeon and Kwon Yul joining on May 4.

The first script reading was held on May 18, 2016, at CJ E&M Center in Sangam-dong, Seoul, South Korea. Episode 1 was aired on July 11, 2016, on tvN channel.

== Episodes ==
No.	Title	Storyboarded by	Written by	Original release date
1	"Episode 1"; Transliteration: "Part 1" (Korean: 제1회)	Unknown	Unknown	July 11, 2016
Park Bong-pal is a 23-year old Economics student at the Myungsung University who has the ability to see ghosts. He exorcises ghosts for money, but he can only take out the weak ones. On one occasion, he receives a call to a girls' high school where he meets Hyun-ji, a wandering ghost searching for memories about her identity and death. During a brief fight with Hyun-ji, Bong-pal accidentally kisses her, which causes her to remember a fragment of time showing the scene of an accident she was seemingly involved in. She investigates Bong-pal's university for clues about him. Two of Bong-pal's upper classmen, Cheon-sang and In-rang, try to enlist him into their club, GhostNet, where the duo supposedly films ghosts and paranormal entities. They end up in the same girl's high school Bong-pal visited earlier, and they encounter a ghost of a teacher that turned out to be a pervert. Bong-pal and the GhostNet members flee the school, but Bong-pal returns to help Hyun-ji defeat the malicious ghost. Hyun-ji watches a professor at Bong-pal's university rescuing a dog stuck in a sewer.
2	"Episode 2"; Transliteration: "Part 2" (Korean: 제2회)	Unknown	Unknown	July 12, 2016
Armed with Bong-pal's address from the university profile, Hyun-ji waits for him at his apartment complex. She tries to deliberately kiss him after a piece of advice from her ghost friend, only for a suspicious Bong-pal to dodge her. Meanwhile, the GhostNet club examines the footage they filmed at the girl's high school, deducing that they have to get Bong-pal recruited or followed because he really can see and fight ghosts. Professor Hye-sung introduces himself as the substitute teacher in Humanities class for a former teacher who stepped down unexpectedly. GhostNet experiences ranking losses due to the Internet troll, Sadako, and their electricity has been turned off. Hyun-ji enlists Bong-pal as the second assistant of Professor Hye-sung. Monk Myung-cheol gets hired by a lady to investigate a room at Gampo Inn; he's getting roughed up by the evil spirit inside. Bong-pal heads home, where he's followed by Hyun-ji, who's waiting to get a meal, while telling her objective. Then, Monk Myung-cheol enters Bong-pal's house with groceries, then they start eating, while Hyun-ji secretly asks for food, Bong-pal makes an extra batch of food for a "demanding stray cat". Meanwhile, school assistant Lim Seo-yeon takes a visit at Hye-sung's animal clinic. Hyun-ji, seeing both Bong-pal and Monk Myung-cheol sleeping, sneaks in and while investigating the house, tries to kiss Bong-pal, but she's thwarted by a suddenly awake Myung-cheol. Bong-pal is heading to the university, preparing for next class while he's being watched by GhostNet, who further confirms that he can interact with ghosts. They then follow him to the same motel where Myung-cheol tried to dispel the evil spirit without raising his suspicion. While washing clothes, Myung-cheol wonders about where he did leave his scimitar, then realizes that he left it at Gampo Inn. At Gampo Inn, they discover the truth behind the haunted room and dispel the evil spirit, and then Bong-pal sees Myung-cheol's scimitar being there, then at the roof of Bong-pal's apartment, they kiss. In the epilogue of the episode, Myung-cheol who fled the Gampo Inn again at night, sees GhostNet's members with all the tranquilizer packets and wakes them up.
3	"Episode 3"; Transliteration: "Part 3" (Korean: 제3회)	Unknown	Unknown	July 18, 2016
After Bong-pal and Hyun-ji kiss, she abruptly leaves, making Bong-pal dissatisfied. Meanwhile, at a different location, a woman is seen recording committing suicide. The next day, Bong-pal thinks about Hyun-ji's abrupt departure yesterday, and she has a small talk with her friend, Kyung-ja, who has been searching for her "honey" the whole campus at Bong-pal's university. Then, Hyun-ji meets up with Bong-pal, reasoning her abrupt departure by telling that no further memories came back to her and that she'll help him with his further jobs. Lim Seo-yeon sees that the rescued dog at Professor Hye-sung's animal clinic still hasn't been adopted, so she decides to adopt it. Meanwhile, Cheon-sang has trouble dealing with Sadako's constant trolling. Bong-pal goes shopping, and while shopping, Hyun-ji throws in a pink toothbrush and cup, because if they'll get to live together, she'll need them. She also nags Bong-pal to buy some meat. After finishing the shopping, Hyun-ji sees a pink dress she likes and wants Bong-pal to buy it for her and give it to her by burning it. Cheon-sang runs into another problem caused by Sadako. Bong-pal and Hyun-ji are getting ready for the meal, when Monk Myung-cheol appears and reveals that he was searching for his scimitar all day, which was at his apartment. Then he eats the meal made by Bong-pal, and uses the toothbrush that Hyun-ji got which upsets her. The next day, Cheon-sang, along with In-rang goes to Sadako's apartment to beat him up, but for their surprise, they see him cold dead. The guys call the police, the detective reveals that Sadako was also sued by hallyu star Miz. During the guys' questioning at the police, Cheon-sang tells that Sadako hacked his ID to post malicious comments under his name. It is also revealed in a report that Miz had an anti-fan community led by Sadako and had many negative comments. During the questioning, the sergeant receives a report that another member of the anti-fan community has died. It is revealed by the news that Miz took her own life yesterday night, and her suicide video is spreading like wildfire. They check the anti-fan community, but then In-rang gets nervous because Cheon-sang is also a "target" of her. Professor Hye-sung sees Noh Hyun-joo feeding a cat, and gets scratched by it while tries to check its condition, Monk Myung-cheol prepares for a ceremony, he records his lecture on his phone, and gets a call while he plays the recording, which leads to further interruption of the ceremony. In-rang asks for Bong-pal's help, and they rush to save Cheon-sang's life and dispel the ghost of Miz by telling her that she's the one who hates herself the most and if she's not loving herself, no one can love her. Then, after getting home, Bong-pal burns the dress for Hyun-ji, who's happy about having the new outfit.
4	"Episode 4"; Transliteration: "Part 4" (Korean: 제4회)	Unknown	Unknown	July 19, 2016
GhostNet gets evicted from their room, and they're ignoring Bong-pal's messages. Hyun-ji rests for a while, then after waking up, she sees Bong-pal readying up for his classes, then Bong-pal warns her not to enter a particular room while he's out. Then she follows him to the university. At the university, she has a talk with Kyung-ja, and she says that she'd be even prettier with high heels. Then in the auditorium, Bong-pal helps Lim Seo-yeon to put the textbooks on the desks, and Hye-sung greets them, but she sees the scar on Hye-sung's hand, and Hyun-ji has a closer look on the scar, and is surprised when she notices that Hye-sung dodged her instead of going straight out in the exit, which she tells to Bong-pal during the lecture, but he disregards her. Bong-pal notices that GhostNet is avoiding his texts but only sees the eviction notice on their room. Meanwhile, GhostNet not only has to get the fee for Bong-pal, but also, the service bill for their room. Lim Seo-yeon meets with Noh Hyun-joo, who was missed class and seemingly is upset about something. Then it is shown that at late night yesterday she witnessed that Hye-sung killed the cat that scratched his hand and dropped his pen on the scene during the act. Then she runs off, and accidentally drops Hye-sung's pen which Lim Seo-yeon picks up. Then, Bong-pal prepares the measurement tests for Hyun-ji, who wants to take the SAT because she thinks that's what is needed for his crossing over, then she performs badly on the tests prepared. After this, Lim Seo-yeon returns the pen she picked up to Hye-sung, who's upset about having a witness. Monk Myung-cheol has a visit at the acupuncturist and has a talk with him about Bong-pal's father and reveals that another "young and handsome fellow" was also looking for him, and noting that Bong-pal's father had an unfinished letter at his motel room. GhostNet is looking forward to make cash, but they had their camera equipment damaged from their previous encounters, and cannot return it under warranty. They also looking for accommodation, and they find a cheap spa, but Cheon-sang gets targeted by the evil spirit inside. Back at Bong-pal's apartment, Hyun-ji falls asleep in the midst of the tutoring session, and after waking up, she sees that the "forbidden room" has its door slightly open, so she takes a peek inside and sees a pair of high heels and asks Bong-pal to give it to her, but this upsets him and tells her to stop trying to act like a human when she's a ghost. Then Bong-pal bumps into GhostNet, and they go to the haunted spa to get the money. Bong-pal makes lunch and Hyun-ji is happy to have some of it as well. Then, the nurses at Hye-sung's animal clinic having a talk about how suddenly he did transfer his operations from the older area and they see him leaving the clinic and tells them to get home. Then Bong-pal, along with Hyun-ji is meeting up with GhostNet at a bar, because they'll pay their fee. At the bar, they offer Bong-pal soju bombs, which he declines, and they offer him a good proposal from their reward money, and to get it he needs to ward off the ghost in the spa. Hyun-ji drinks one of the soju bombs and becomes drunk. They dispel the ghost even though it was a tough one. A drunken Hyun-ji tries to fight with Bong-pal, but after it is not successful, she tells that she did not want to be a ghost and does not even know why she died. Then she passes out and Bong-pal carries her home. Noh Hyun-joo is heading home, she gets caught off guard by Hye-sung, who then chokes her.
5	"Episode 5"; Transliteration: "Part 5" (Korean: 제5회)	Unknown	Unknown	July 25, 2016
Bong-pal makes bean sprout soup for Hyun-ji, then wakes her up. He also receives the cut from GhostNet's reward money, along with a message from them, then Bong-pal, along with Hyun-ji check his savings balance, and Hyun-ji is surprised about Bong-pal's balance and wonders about why he's stingy about money. Then they get on the bus. At the university, Cheon-sang and In-rang like their success, and they have rebranded their group to "Sundae Soup". They are trying to secure a deal with Bong-pal where they operate the club with they taking up the tasks for dispelling ghosts and they share the profit, and providing a car for Bong-pal's use to get to the locations. They get declined by him and they're snooping on Bong-pal once again, and they conclude that in order to get Bong-pal in their group, they have to enroll Lim Seo-yeon into their group, and that will make him join right away. Then, the nurses at Hye-sung's animal clinic are wondering why is he being late, but then he's seen arriving and the nurses are wondering how he got mud traces on his shoes. Then he changes his outfit, and throws his old clothes into a garbage bag. Hye-sung, at the class, offers early leave for the class, does attendance check, noting that Noh Hyun-joo is missing again. After the class is finished, he invites Bong-pal and Lim Seo-yeon for a meal. At the restaurant, Hye-sung asks Bong-pal where does he live and if he's seen his father lately. Meanwhile, Hyun-ji is having a talk with Kyung-ja, saying she's angry about Bong-pal having a crush on Lim Seo-yeon. Then, after nearly tripping down the stairs, she's saved by Bong-pal, who was looking for her. Sundae Soup enrolls Lim Seo-yeon. Hye-sung, at his animal clinic, goes through an old photo album, which has photos of Bong-pal, then he later checks out the apartment block, in which he resides. Back at Bong-pal's apartment, Hyun-ji sees the old photos of Bong-pal's family, and apologizes for her earlier mistake. Sundae Soup drives a beaten-up minivan to Bong-pal's apartment, and Bong-pal, seeing that Lim Seo-yeon is on the club's list, instantly registers to the club, and they drive to their first location, which is an apartment that is seemingly haunted. At the apartment block's playground, they see a woman sitting on the stairs, who then gets escorted away from the scene. Monk Myung-cheol visits the virgin bodhisattva to get an amulet that can keep the ghosts away, then the bodhisattva says that she heard about his failed attempt at Gampo Inn's case, which was masterfully handled by another exorcist, which then is revealed to be Bong-pal. Meanwhile, at the apartment, Bong-pal and Hyun-ji investigate the scene and they see a small kid running through the corridor of the apartment, but after trying to stop him, he bites Bong-pal's arm, and they see another ghost approaching, but it seemingly disappears and they run into Sundae Soup, then they drive back home, where Bong-pal searches about the apartment's history and finds an article detailing the death of an abusive husband in the apartment, and then they quickly take a taxi back to the apartment, and when they arrive, they see the woman again at the stairs. In the apartment, Bong-pal says that the kid there is hiding from his stepfather's ghost, and the story of them is told by flashbacks, revealing that the woman sitting at the stairs is the mother of the kid. Then Bong-pal fights off the ghost of the kid's stepfather, then they guide the kid back to his mother, and the two reunite, which then leads Bong-pal to reminisce about his childhood, where he experienced the same feeling, when her mother's ghost was consoling him, but she eventually had to leave him. While they are heading back home, they see Monk Myung-cheol drinking soju at an inn, and he pours one cup for Bong-pal, then he says that he knows about Bong-pal's side jobs, and he has to stop doing exorcising ghosts for his mother's sake. Then, back at Bong-pal's apartment, he has a nightmare featuring ghosts.
6	"Episode 6"; Transliteration: "Part 6" (Korean: 제6회)	Unknown	Unknown	July 26, 2016
A hiker finds Noh Hyun-joo's corpse, then the police start investigating the scene. Meanwhile, Hye-sung burns all belongings of Noh Hyun-joo, along with his older outfit he threw in the garbage bag earlier. The next day, Bong-pal sees that it is Saturday, the day of his mother's memorial day, and dresses into formal clothing, and Hyun-ji follows him. After the memorial day ceremony, Bong-pal has a chat with Monk Myung-cheol, who notes that he didn't hear anything new from his father. Bong-pal feels a bit down, so Hyun-ji cheers him up. Sundae Soup officially restarts their group, now backed with the two new members, and they get back their room. Hyun-ji realizes that she's totally fallen into Bong-pal after having a talk with Kyung-ja. Sundae Soup decides to go on a vacation with their new members, which is successfully approved by all members because Lim Seo-yeon is also going. Meanwhile, at the police station, Detective Yang starts to work on the case of Noh Hyun-joo, and finds it strange that her neck was broken which is impossible to happen by a human's hand. Lim Seo-yeon goes to Hye-sung's clinic with the dog she adopted from it, and she says that she needs a temporary shelter for it, because she and Bong-pal are going on the group vacation, and also gives him a new, white fountain pen as a gift. Sundae Soup goes to the vacation house of In-rang's relatives, but they have trouble with the door lock which is solved quickly. In-rang tries to take some supplies upstairs, and trips on the stairs and hits his head. Hyun-ji sees all of the incident and runs to him, asking if he's all right, and he sees a glimpse of her before gets rescued by Cheon-sang. In-rang thinks that he saw an angel, Hyun-ji is also surprised by this. Cheon-sang tries to bring Bong-pal and Lim Seo-yeon by sending Bong-pal to the nearby grocery store to pick up some ramen noodles, which Hyun-ji tries to detest, after she eavesdropped on Cheon-sang. At the grocery store, Bong-pal picks up an extra package of ice cream. Sundae Soup already set up the grill pit, and after having a debate on the extra package of ice cream, Bong-pal wins the debate, then he gives it to Hyun-ji. Then they start to eat the grilled meat and have some drinks along with it. Lim Seo-yeon gives a chunk of blood sausage to Bong-pal which Hyun-ji wants, but after not getting it, she starts to blow the smoke from the grill pit to Seo-yeon's face, and the Bong-pal switches seats with her. Back at the university, Detective Kim tries to question Hye-sung about the missing student. After giving inconclusive information about her, they leave the scene after giving a contact number card. Sundae Soup has a good time at a nearby lake, then they take photos. At the police station, Detective Yang, along with Detective Kim, look into Hye-sung's info and notice that he turned down a prestigious university's offer and closed his well-known business at the Gangnam area just to work at the Myungsung University and opened a small clinic near it. In the absence of Bong-pal, Hye-sung enters his apartment and investigates the room he put all her mother's diaries, then he steals one diary from it. Back at the vacation apartment, Sundae Soup hosts a drinking game. While Monk Myung-cheol heads to Bong-pal's apartment, he crosses paths with Hye-sung, who greets him as if they've already met once, which surprises Myung-cheol. Back at the drinking game, In-rang sees Hyun-ji again and it is revealed that Lim Seo-yeon likes someone other than Bong-pal. The next day at the lake, Lim Seo-yeon gets grabbed down by a ghost, but Bong-pal thinks that Hyun-ji pushed her into the lake. After rescuing her, he runs to the grocery store to get medicine for her wound. On the way to the store, Hyun-ji pleads that she didn't do anything, but get disregarded by Bong-pal, because she was the only one besides her at the dock. At the grocery store, the cashier lady asks if they were at the nearby lake, which is a forbidden area because they had numerous death cases there, and there are rumors about a "lake ghost". Bong-pal is running back when realizing that Hyun-ji was right but she's already dragged down by the lake ghost.
7	"Episode 7"; Transliteration: "Part 7" (Korean: 제7회)	Unknown	Unknown	August 1, 2016
Bong-pal gets rid of the lake ghost and rescues Hyun-ji, who isn't feeling well. Bong-pal schedules his school project to a later point and looks over Hyun-ji, and moves her to a proper bed and makes food for her. Sundae Soup is running into money problems again and they are soon meeting an "investor". Monk Myung-cheol decides to check on Bong-pal's father, and notices that his apartment is empty, but is filled with warding amulets. Meanwhile, Kyung-ja finally finds her "honey", who is Hye-sung, then she follows her to his animal clinic. Back at Bong-pal's apartment, Hyun-ji tells Bong-pal that she recovered another memory fragment while sleeping, which now includes a woman who's worried about her. At the apartment of Bong-pal's father, Monk Myung-cheol asks the owner lady about the "handsome young fellow" who was interested in him. The lady says she thought it was his son, so she let the man into his house, then both are gone into the mountains nearby. Myung-cheol investigates the scene at the mountains and notices that something's off with the scene but doesn't know what it is. The next day, Bong-pal and Lim Seo-yeon talk about their school project. Sundae Soup meets the "investor", who is In-rang's grandma, who isn't keen to acknowledge Cheon-sang as In-rang's friend because he's a con artist, and when detailing their project for which they request the funding, both get kicked out of her home. Back at the school, Lim Seo-yeon and Hye-sung has a talk, then Detective Yang and Detective Kim question Seo-yeon about Noh Hyung-joo, and Detective Yang notices that Hye-sung was up there, watching them. Monk Myung-cheol calls the phone of Bong-pal's father, but it is ringing at Hye-sung's animal clinic. Sundae Soup gives the photos made at the group vacation to Bong-pal, then Bong-pal goes to the library with Hyun-ji to study. At the library, Hyun-ji doodles on Bong-pal's photos and after seeing the bad performance of Hyun-ji, he promises to her if she scores more than 80 points on her next exam, he'll grant one of her wishes. Hyun-ji also sees a girl who looks directly at her while muttering something. Sundae Soup buys a tuxedo for Bong-pal, then they go for their new task: a girl who's possessed. The girl's mother describes how it all happened, and the case now is tougher because there's a link between the ghost and the girl, which is broken when the girl's mother realizes that she was the main cause of why the issue happened, and pleads for her daughter to forgive her. With the link broken, they dispel the ghost easily. Hyun-ji, seeing the grieving mother with her now-freed daughter, deduces that the woman in her newly-recovered memory fragment must be her mother. Back at home, she takes her new test, and she scores 82 points, and having succeeded at achieving Bong-pal's expectations, she says that she wants to visit the amusement park, and they agree on a specified time. Detective Yang asks the coroner about the nature of Noh Hyun-joo's death, who says that it is hard to get that strength for an average person. Detective Kim shows the footage of the camera near the scene and notes that the camera stopped recording for five minutes. At Hye-sung's animal clinic, the dogs are making a ruckus, then Hye-sung investigates it, then Kyung-ja is seen being nosy around Hye-sung's clinic, and she picks up the ringing phone in his desk drawer, which also has Hyun-ji's student ID card, then Hye-sung returns to his desktop and notices that Kyung-ja was messing around his desk. Bong-pal is unable to make it into the amusement park appointment with Hyun-ji, because Lim Seo-yeon has an accident right before he was leaving the university, and goes to assist her. Bong-pal's absence leaves Hyun-ji disappointed.
8	"Episode 8"; Transliteration: "Part 8" (Korean: 제8회)	Unknown	Unknown	August 2, 2016
Hye-sung destroys Kyung-ja's spirit after notices that she messed with his desk. Bong-pal arrives to the amusement park just as Hyun-ji leaves the scene, but he finds her at his apartment's roof, and tells her that they'll have another appointment. Monk Myung-cheol files a missing person report on Bong-pal's father at the police station. Back at Hye-sung's clinic, it is revealed that he killed Bong-pal's father while trying to beat out the location of a package from him, then Hye-sung looks at Hyun-ji's student ID card. At Myungsung University, In-rang looks at the picture that managed to capture Hyun-ji, and it is getting noticed by Cheon-sang, who then guesses who is his crush. Then Bong-pal arrives and In-rang points to Hyun-ji's captured form, which surprises Bong-pal and Cheon-sang. Hyun-ji acknowledges that Bong-pal missed their appointment at the amusement park because of Lim Seo-yeon. While leaving the university, she comes across Hye-sung, who notices her presence. Hye-sung, at the class, informs the class about Noh Hyun-joo's death, then starts calling off the names. Back at home, Bong-pal makes the meal and he eats along with Hyun-ji. During the meal, they arrange the new appointment for the amusement park, then Bong-pal gives a tuxedo outfit to Hyun-ji. Sundae Soup gets a new task at a defunct mental institute, and they are bringing their new camera equipment to the location. En route to the building, they detail that while the institute was operating, it is revealed after a police investigation that the institute got shut down because of human rights issues and there were numerous death cases. At the institute, Hyun-ji has a fragment of a flashback when she looks at the surgical lamp. The group investigates different rooms, Bong-pal and Hyun-ji discover a log that contains entries for eight casualties while they've been briefed about seven. Cheon-sang and In-rang get into a little ghost problem, and while Hyun-ji arrives to the scene, rescues In-rang, along with Cheon-sang. When Bong-pal arrives, she notices that the ghosts there aren't planning to hurt them, but rather they want to escape from the institute. They report the case to the police, who find the missing corpses near the facility. Then Bong-pal tells Cheon-sang and In-rang about the existence of Hyun-ji, who's always tagging along with him. At the amusement park's Ferris wheel, Hyun-ji expresses her feelings to Bong-pal, who's a bit surprised about her confession, then she teleports away, right near to Hye-sung's clinic, and Hye-sung notices that Bong-pal is searching for her. Hye-sung asks Bong-pal about the person he was looking for, which he answers that it is someone he knows. Then, Bong-pal sees Hye-sung's clinic for the first time. At Bong-pal's home, both Hyun-ji and Bong-pal are nervous because they don't know what to do next. Then they get a quick job from Sundae Soup, which they quickly finish. In-rang offers a pair of high heels to Hyun-ji, but Bong-pal intentionally miscommunicates Hyun-ji's feelings about his offer. Detective Yang and Detective Kim question the nurses at Hye-sung's clinic about his whereabouts on the day Noh Hyun-joo died, who notes that Hye-sung left the clinic early and didn't return until the next day, and when returning, he had mud on his shoes. Then, after Hye-sung returns to the clinic, they leave. Bong-pal and Hyun-ji, on the route to home, play a wish game on the stairs, and Hyun-ji wins, and her wish is to have her confession forgotten by Bong-pal. Then, Hyun-ji starts vanishing mysteriously, and she says that she doesn't feel well, which upsets Bong-pal, but she eventually returns.
9	"Episode 9"; Transliteration: "Part 9" (Korean: 제9회)	Unknown	Unknown	August 8, 2016
Bong-pal moves to the couch in the living room, and lets Hyun-ji sleep in his bedroom. At the police station, Detective Kim and Detective Yang look further into Hye-sung's file, and they note that he's too perfect compared to his medical records from his childhood, which detail that he was very ill, and weak. They also note that his father died in an unfortunate accident while he was young, and he's living with his mother, and they rarely see each other. Meanwhile, Hye-sung is at Noh Hyun-joo's funeral, and sees a man who confessed his love to her last year, getting drunk. The next day, Bong-pal makes breakfast, then goes to the library with Hyun-ji, who then has something other to do. Sundae Soup gets the meal order and Cheon-sang sees that there's an extra meal in the package, which In-rang has ordered for Hyun-ji. Then at Bong-pal's sitting place, Hyun-ji wonders about Kyung-ja's absence. Bong-pal searches for Hyun-ji at Sundae Soup's room, who were readying up to eat the meals, then Bong-pal asks dating tips from Cheon-sang, who shows several lousy tips to him. Back at home, Bong-pal meets Hyun-ji at the apartment's roof, and tries the tips which obviously don't work. He then tries with the surefire method: food, which works the best. He then tells some astronomy facts to her, which he learned from his father. Then the next day, Bong-pal and Hyun-ji go for a date, and he buys some new clothes for her, watches a movie with her at the cinema, and eats out with her, then holds an umbrella above her when it starts raining on the way back to home. At the police station, Detective Kim and Detective Yang find evidence showing Hye-sung exiting the tollgates at the day of Noh Hyun-joo's murder. Back at Bong-pal's home, Hyun-ji has another flashback, then calls for him. He then details her how he's able to see ghosts, and tells her about the evil spirit who tried to invade his body. At Hye-sung's questioning at the police, he details that he was visiting her mother, who lives near the mountains, then Detective Kim gets a call that a witness is dead, who's Hyun-joo's lover, who also claimed that he killed Hyun-joo. But it is just a cover made by Hye-sung, who killed the man. Then, the police releases Hye-sung after his questioning. Bong-pal and Hyun-ji takes a visit at Hye-sung's clinic, and Hye-sung sees that Hyun-ji is following the dog she was petting downstairs, but before anything could happen, Bong-pal distracts Hye-sung, then Hyun-ji safely leaves the scene. Then, Monk Myung-cheol has a talk with Bong-pal after seeing him with Hye-sung, then Bong-pal informs him that he's a professor at his school. Myung-cheol then looks for the date of Bong-pal's graduation, where Bong-pal's father sent him his last SMS. He asks Bong-pal about when his graduation was, and it was in February, then he checks the video recording of Bong-pal's graduation. Then, Bong-pal gets a new task from Sundae Soup. Sundae Soup briefs Bong-pal about the task, which is a man, Hyeon-min, who's seemingly possessed by a ghost, and they see that the ghost they saw is on the pictures near his desk, then they leave because he's too unstable, and they have to come back in two days to the scene, then outside, Cheon-sang tells In-rang to not want a ghost around him, and this is overheard by Hyun-ji. While watching the video recording, Myung-cheol notices that Hye-sung is at the location, and is looking at Bong-pal's father. Then, Bong-pal confesses his feelings to Hyun-ji, and that he doesn't care what others think about their relationship.
10	"Episode 10"; Transliteration: "Part 10" (Korean: 제10회)	Unknown	Unknown	August 9, 2016
Monk Myung-cheol takes a visit to Hye-sung's animal clinic, and says that he's familiar to him. Then after the nurses arrive back to the clinic, they shake hands. After Myung-cheol leaves the clinic, he notices that his hand is trembling. He then notes that something is off with Hye-sung. After Bong-pal and Hyun-ji return home, they notice that Myung-cheol watched his graduation recording, then he turns off the camera equipment, and he tells to Hyun-ji that his father recorded it along with other random stuff. At Myungsung University, a student sees a strange person at the lower levels of the university, which he thinks is a ghost, and goes to Sundae Soup, who then investigate the scene for a very unique-looking person. Then, while searching the person at the upper level, Cheon-sang and In-rang capture the "ghost", who then revealed to be a former student who's now being a germanium salesman and hiding around the university. Then, Cheon-sang brings a germanium mat he accepted as a payment for the investigation. He also got a bracelet from him, then In-rang notices that the "germanium" bracelet made rashes on Cheon-sang's wrist. Detective Yang and Detective Kim go to the coroner to see Noh Hyun-joo's lover's corpse, then they drive to the address of Hye-sung's mother. Hyeon-min has another fit, then leaves. His sister sees the ghost which was there. In-rang writes a love letter for Hyun-ji, which gets noticed by Cheon-sang, then he gets a new call. Hye-sung's class is cancelled, then Lim Seo-yeon texts him if he's alright. Bong-pal receives a call from Cheon-sang. Detective Yang and Detective Kim starting the questioning of Hye-sung's mother, but they get surprised when Hye-sung suddenly appears at the door, then the detectives have to stop the questioning. At Hyeon-min's apartment, his sister details that she saw the ghost of his lover, Su-gyeong, and his sister is concerned about him because he went missing an hour ago. Then Sundae Soup drives to the bridge where Hyeon-min scattered Su-gyeong's ashes, but their car breaks down because of an engine problem, but they eventually get there, and Su-gyeong's spirit says that she wants to save him from causing self-harm, and Bong-pal rescues him from the lake, then it is revealed that Hyeon-min and Su-gyeong are tragic lovers. Then Su-gyeong says to Hyeon-min that he has to promise that he won't hurt himself again and will move on with his life. Back at home, In-rang wants to give his letter to Hyun-ji, and Bong-pal tells him that she already has a boyfriend. At the roof of Bong-pal's apartment, Bong-pal and Hyun-ji are discussing that they will part ways at sometime, just like the tragic lovers they've helped. Then, a heartbroken In-rang tries to get after Hyun-ji, but is stopped by Cheon-sang. Monk Myung-cheol visits the virgin Bodhisattva, asking for the weapon he used at Bong-pal's treatment when he was little, and also asks her to create a ghost warding amulet. The bodhisattva says that the weapon is a rare item. Then at Bong-pal's apartment's corridor, Myung-cheol notices that he's laughing, which is uncommon for him. He then witnesses that he's talking to Hyun-ji, and starts questioning him, and after giving him a stern warning, Bong-pal negotiates with him to stay out of his business. Hyun-ji gets to know that Bong-pal's mother had died from a ghost, and he's saving money to fix his vision, then she stays at home before meeting Bong-pal at the school. Then, Myung-cheol realizes that it is Bong-pal's birthday, and buys a cake for him, he then goes back to his apartment to deliver the cake. At the apartment, he crosses paths with Hyun-ji, and tells her to not leave and the story how he driven out the evil spirit from Bong-pal's body, but it was too strong for him, and it resulted in the evil spirit taking up the form of a black mist that first attacked him, then pushed Bong-pal's mother into a car which hit her. He then says to give up on Bong-pal for his sake. Meanwhile, Bong-pal is rushing back to his apartment and he sees the cake on his desk. At the roof, he meets with Hyun-ji, and she asks about his birthday, and they decide to go on a cruise ship to celebrate it. At the ship, they watch the fireworks and then Hyun-ji tells Bong-pal that he wants him to be happy, and is sorry for everything, then wishes him a happy birthday. Then, she asks him to get some drinks, then disappears. Bong-pal is searching for her and gets upset. Hyun-ji is seen reverting her outfit to her school outfit.
11	"Episode 11"; Transliteration: "Part 11" (Korean: 제11회)	Unknown	Unknown	August 15, 2016
When returning home, Bong-pal only sees Hyun-ji's clothes on his bed, which then disappear. Monk Myung-cheol searches for Hye-sung on the university webpage, and takes his profile photo. Then Bong-pal has a talk with Myung-cheol who tells him that he said Hyun-ji to give up on him for his sake. There was an accident at a certain road, then Cheon-sang ask the details of the accident from the insurance manager there. Then he wonders why no one is answering his calls, including Bong-pal. At the memorial place of Bong-pal's mother, Hye-sung talks about why he (the ghost possessing him) caused her accident, but the monk around sees him being there for a quite long time, but then he leaves. Detective Yang and Detective Kim, at a different location, doing the questioning of another woman, when they see that the woman has pictures of her son, but when they were at Hye-sung's mother, there were no pictures of him on the wall, and when he suddenly appeared at the door, she was quite startled by his appearance. Then Detective Yang decides to look into the case of Hye-sung's father, and Detective Kim is gathering more info on him. Bong-pal searches for Hyun-ji on the places they used to go, then at Sundae Soup, Cheon-sang notices that In-rang is getting boozed up, and outside, has a talk with Lim Seo-yeon. Meanwhile, Hyun-ji wanders around, and visits the amusement park's Ferris wheel, which then also gets checked by Bong-pal, but when Hyun-ji sees him there, she teleports away, but is stopped when she has another flashback and she then tells him that it is not about what Myung-cheol said to her, but their relationship, and tells him that she only wanted to be saved by Bong-pal. Then, Cheon-sang and In-rang see Bong-pal getting boozed up at a local shop, but after he says that Hyun-ji will no longer be with him, In-rang is also grabbing a bottle of soju. Then, Cheon-sang carries Bong-pal back to his apartment, where he sees that Bong-pal is sleep-talking. He then grabs In-rang and carries him back. Hye-sung, at his clinic, goes through the phone of Bong-pal's father, then he notices that he had called Hanil University Hospital, then Hye-sung calls one of his acquaintances working there, and asks a favor from him. Then, Myung-cheol goes to Bong-pal's apartment, and notices that he reeks of alcohol, then he orders a meal for him after seeing that his fridge is empty and leaves. At Myungsung University, where Hyun-ji slept, she has a flashback and recalls the name of her school. Then Bong-pal awakes, sees the message left by Myung-cheol, then eats the meal ordered by him, and throws Hyun-ji's belongings at his place in the garbage bin. Then, Myung-cheol gets a call from the virgin bodhisattva, in which she details that he needs to visit the temple where is the memorial place, because the monk there has some information for him about Bong-pal's father. The monk there details that there was a man staying in front of memorial place of Bong-pal's mother, and he identifies Hye-sung as that man, and also notes that he also was there five years ago, when he had last seen Bong-pal's father, who was taking a baggie from his wife's memorial place, then the monk also notes that ran away when he saw Hye-sung approaching. Myung-cheol gets interested in why Hye-sung is lingering around Bong-pal. Then, at Sundae Soup's room, Cheon-sang hosts a post-relationship therapy session, which then gets interrupted by a call by the manager. Hyun-ji gets the address of her school. Hye-sung makes the professors acquaintance at Hanil University Hospital, and then Hye-sung says that he's looking for Bong-pal's father, and the professor says that there aren't any records for him. Then, Hye-sung sees Hyun-ji nearby, and she remembers her accident, which was in front of her school. Then Hye-sung parks his car nearby and stays stationed there. Then it is revealed that Hye-sung caused her car accident, and he was looking for a package she was supposed to deliver, then he took her bag. Then Hyun-ji remembers that she's in Hanil University Hospital, which then upsets Hye-sung. At the hospital, Hyun-ji sees her mother leaving the hospital, then she follows her home, then at her home, she investigates her room. Sundae Soup is heading to the haunted road, and they encounter it, and Bong-pal dispels the ghost. He then nearly gets hit by a car. Back at her home, Hyun-ji sees that her mother is called back to the hospital and follows her. Sundae Soup is driving Bong-pal to the hospital, because of his injuries look severe. At the hospital, Hyun-ji is getting transferred to the ICU, and Sundae Soup just arrive when the doctors get her into the elevator. Then, Bong-pal's wounds get treated, but still has to get his x-ray scan. Hyun-ji then sees that she's alive, but has been in a coma for five years and thinks that Bong-pal will be happy if he knows it. Then, Hye-sung also sees that she's alive, and after getting Hyun-ji's data, he then asks about the chances of her awakening from her coma. Hyun-ji's ghost then searches for Bong-pal and finds him at the entrance of the hospital, then she tells him that she's alive and won't leave him alone again. Then Hye-sung throws her body into cardiac arrest, but then the doctors coming for her aid successfully revive her, and she opens her eyes.
12	"Episode 12"; Transliteration: "Part 12" (Korean: 제12회)	Unknown	Unknown	August 16, 2016
Bong-pal collapses after seeing Hyun-ji disappear (who then got resurrected into her body), then Cheon-sang and In-rang carry him back to his bed. Meanwhile, the now-alive Hyun-ji gets greeted by everyone, but she has amnesia, and she doesn't remember her accident and everything she experienced during her ghost form. The head doctor reassures Hyun-ji's mother that she will recover her memories over time. Then, Bong-pal's doctor reassures him that he's going to be alright after he rests the whole day and takes his vitamins. Then Cheon-sang notes that he eventually collapsed after the loss of Hyun-ji, then he details to In-rang that Bong-pal and Hyun-ji possibly had a relationship, and after she left him, it all came down to his current state. Myung-cheol has a visit at the virgin bodhisattva, where they discuss about the spirit weapon Myung-cheol used when he was treating Bong-pal, and he was informed by the monk at the temple that Bong-pal's mother already prepared one before she died. Then they conclude that the baggie that Bong-pal's father dragged from her memorial place was the weapon, and the evil spirit (inside Hye-sung) hangs around Bong-pal is because it is looking for destroy that weapon. Then, at Bong-pal's apartment, Myung-cheol doesn't find him, so he calls on his phone, which Cheon-sang answers and tells him that he's at the Hanil University Hospital. At the hospital, Myung-cheol meets with Cheon-sang and In-rang, who formally introduce themselves, then after closely looking at them, Myung-cheol recognizes them as the two people he saw at Gampo Inn. Then he realizes that they use Bong-pal to their benefit, which they detest. Then Myung-cheol grabs Cheon-sang's ear and tells him about the dangers of dispelling ghosts. Then after releasing Cheon-sang's ear, he orders both of them to watch over Bong-pal while he's looking for the doctor. Then In-rang offers to buy something to eat. Everyone is amazed about how Hyun-ji awoke after 5 years of being in a coma, and the hospital has given her a gift as well. On his way back, In-rang asks about the big crowd, and then they say that it is a girl who came back from 5 years of coma, and when seeing her, he realizes that it is actually Hyun-ji, as it says on the patient nameplate next to her room. Then Bong-pal awakes, and wants to look for Hyun-ji, but In-rang says that she's in the hospital, and she's just woken up from 5 years of coma, then Bong-pal is searching for her room, and he then hugs her, but Hyun-ji is confused by this and asks him to leave. Bong-pal tells Cheon-sang and In-rang that Hyun-ji doesn't recognize him, then they conclude that she doesn't recognize them as well, and that she wasn't a ghost, but a wandering soul who was in a limbo stage. Then Cheon-sang and In-rang ask a flattered nurse. Back at Bong-pal's apartment, Myung-cheol makes oxtail soup for him, and Bong-pal excuses himself for his yelling with him earlier. Then Cheon-sang and In-rang give him his backpack that he left at the hospital, and also tell him that Hyun-ji was a victim of a hit-and-run accident and has amnesia because of the trauma, and that's why she can't remember him, but she'll get her memories back over time. They also say that he should be at her side. Then, Myung-cheol acknowledges that Hyun-ji is alive and is in the hospital Bong-pal was staying at. Bong-pal then packs up her books and the toothbrush and cup she bought in a bag. Sundae Soup then plots revenge against the person who caused Hyun-ji's accident, then they search for the business card of the police officer who questioned them when Sadako died. At the police station, Detective Yang is looking into the case of Hye-sung's father, and concludes that his father couldn't lose balance at the balcony, unless someone "helped" him, and decides to re-investigate the case of Hye-sung. Back at the hospital, Hyun-ji has her exercise session, then she's heading back to her room with her wheelchair, but has a little trouble getting up the ramp, and starts rolling backwards, but is stopped by a suddenly appearing Hye-sung, who then questions her about her memories, and quickly gets liked by her and her mother. Then, Hyun-ji's mother gives her a new phone, which she checks out, and Bong-pal arrives with her books, then he formally introduces him to her, and shows her his student ID, then he says that he's her boyfriend. He then saves his number in her phone, then puts her books and the toothbrush and cup combo on her desk. He then tells her that he'll keep coming to visit her every day from now on until she gets her memory back. Then her mother sees the things Bong-pal left for her, and asks if she bought them, but she intends to trash them, until her mother says that the cup is the exact type she was using since her childhood and would always choose the pink combo. Then, Hyun-ji is looking at the exercise book she was using, and sees the photos she doodled on, and when seeing the one where she had written her name, she recalls a fragment of the day of the group vacation with Bong-pal. Then she's bumping into Bong-pal at various locations through the days. At one day, Bong-pal is making her favorite dishes, and after leaving the exercise, Hyun-ji sees Hye-sung doing pet therapy at the hospital, and then has a small talk with him, saying that she would have applied to Myungsung University before her accident, and would have graduated by now. Then Monk Myung-cheol leaves a gift for Hyun-ji, and notices that she's talking with Hye-sung. Bong-pal also arrives and he also wonders what they are doing. Then, Bong-pal is waiting for Hyun-ji, and offers her the meals he made. Hyun-ji is initially reluctant to accept his offer, but after he mentions that he has grilled meat in the dishes, she accepts it, and starts to eat, and she asks Bong-pal how he made all of her favorites, and he answers that she told him. Myung-cheol goes to Hye-sung's clinic and investigates the lower floor, and the office down there and notices that Hye-sung has the ID card of Hyun-ji, which raises his suspicion. Hye-sung soon arrives in the clinic, and downstairs, Myung-cheol avoids his suspicion by telling him that he went to the wrong room while searching the bathroom there. Back at the hospital, Hyun-ji ate everything that Bong-pal made. Then he tries to have more time with her, but when the crutched Hyun-ji tries to hit him, she starts falling, but Bong-pal saves her from falling, and they nearly kiss for the second "first time", just like how they kissed accidentally at the Seoyi Girls' High School. But she quickly evades that to happen, saying that she didn't have her first kiss yet, but after Bong-pal says that they've already kissed, she starts to fight with him. Then after returning to her room, she notices that she dropped her phone at the roof where she was with Bong-pal. Bong-pal, packing up, sees her phone on the floor, and picks it up. Then Hyun-ji gets chased by a former immoral doctor's ghost, then she asks for Bong-pal's help instinctively.
13	"Episode 13"; Transliteration: "Part 13" (Korean: 제13회)	Unknown	Unknown	August 22, 2016
Bong-pal runs to help Hyun-ji, but she passes out from the shock when she saw the doctor's ghost. Bong-pal quickly dispels it, then he asks for help with Hyun-ji. At Hye-sung's clinic, when Myung-cheol is starting to leave, Hye-sung lightly points at that he shouldn't snoop around him with a story he tells to him. Then, Myung-cheol tells him one of Buddha's teachings which say that karma will punish people who take delight in evil actions. Then, at the house oh Hye-sung's mother, Detective Yang tries to question her what happened at her husband's accident 18 years ago, but then she sends him away. At the Hanil University Hospital, the doctors say that Hyun-ji has fainted from a mental shock caused by sensory overload, Hyun-ji's mother then sends Bong-pal away, who then gives her Hyun-ji's phone then leaves. Outside the liquor store, Myung-cheol drinks, then he thinks about why did Hye-sung had Hyun-ji's student ID card, and how they could be connected. Back at the police station, Detective Yang sees that Cheon-sang and In-rang are bothering Detective Kim about searching the criminal who caused Hyun-ji's accident, and they are being so persistent about the reinvestigation that they had to be escorted out from the police station. Then, back at Bong-pal's home, he gets a bandage at his arm wound, then lets in the boozed up Myung-cheol, who gets then sits down at the couch. At the hospital, Hyun-ji awakes, then she asks where did Bong-pal gone, but her mother thinks that he's a bad person, but then Hyun-ji insists that he's a good person and her fainting was not because of him, and he was helping her. Then, Bong-pal and Hyun-ji are texting each other, Hyun-ji has texted him that she gets discharged from the hospital the next day. Then they continue texting until they fall asleep. At the next day, Bong-pal makes bean sprout soup for Myung-cheol, and tells him that Hyun-ji gets discharged from the hospital and goes to see her. On the way, he buys her a necklace. Then, at the hospital, Hyun-ji's mother tells him to leave because being with Hyun-ji yesterday made her faint, and it cannot happen again. Then, the head doctor announces that Hye-sung volunteered to take up the psychological treatment of Hyun-ji, then he offers Hyun-ji and her mother a lift to their house. Back at home, Bong-pal has a talk with Myung-cheol who says that Hyun-ji needs to live a normal life and he should let go of her. At the route to Hyun-ji's house, they have a talk with Hye-sung, then her mother details that she was tasked by someone to do a favor, then after she got there, her accident happened. Then she says that she hopes that the evil person who caused it gets punished. At Hyun-ji's home, her mother notes that it is a temporary home. Then, she tells Hyun-ji to go to her room, and then Hyun-ji finds a huge collection of dresses which her mother bought her for her birthdays, then they are having fun. Then, it is revealed that she was tasked by Bong-pal's father to deliver a package to Bong-pal. At the police station, the chief berates Detective Yang and Detective Kim for their investigations, while there are many more cases left unsolved. Detective Yang decides to continue the investigation, along with Detective Kim. Sundae Soup has a plan to get information on Hyun-ji's accident: They ordered banners which they put to the location of the accident. Meanwhile, Hyun-ji puts on some makeup and prepares to go out. Bong-pal meets with Cheon-sang and In-rang and they tell him that they'll put up the banners, and then they meet Hyun-ji at the university, who came to Hye-sung's lecture. Cheon-sang and In-rang greet her. Then Bong-pal informs Hyun-ji that the two are his seniors, and guides her to the classroom. On the way, Bong-pal asks her how she knows Hye-sung, and she informs him that he's helping with her treatment. At the class, Hyun-ji sees Lim Seo-yeon who then greets her. Lim Seo-yeon notices the bandage on his arm, which also gets noticed by Hyun-ji. Meanwhile, Sundae Soup puts out the banners, but they get a complaint filed on them after they have their banners all over the street. At the police station, Myung-cheol's request for investigation gets overheard by Detective Yang, then Myung-cheol tells him what he got about Hye-sung. Then, Cheon-sang and In-rang get taken to the station because of the filed complaint, and they see that it is about the hit-and-run case which then they start investigating, then Cheon-sang, In-rang and Myung-cheol leave the station. Myung-cheol asks a favor from Sundae Soup regarding Hye-sung. After Hye-sung's lecture, Lim Seo-yeon notices that Hye-sung is now interested in Hyun-ji, then after everyone leaves, Lim Seo-yeon expresses her feelings towards him, but she gets friendzoned by him, and he then gives back the fountain pen she gave to him. Hyun-ji sits next to Bong-pal, then recovers another memory of being there. Then she goes to visit her friends who will help her with studying. Bong-pal sees Lim Seo-yeon at the bus stop being distraught, then they go to a bar, and she starts drinking. Bong-pal tries to stop her from drinking more, then he gets a spill on his shirt, then goes to the bathroom to wash it off. Hyun-ji then leaves the place where she met her friends, and sees a woman nearby who's looking directly at her. She then heads to the pharmacy to get medical supplies for Bong-pal, then she calls him. A drunken Lim Seo-yeon answers Bong-pal's phone, then Hyun-ji is at the scene, and says to Lim Seo-yeon that there's a taxi waiting outside for her, then outside, she says that a man should stay true to his feelings (because she thought that he was cheating her). Bong-pal then kisses her, which again upsets her, and they fight again, but she then treats Bong-pal's arm wound. On their way, Hyun-ji and Bong-pal get to Hyun-ji's home, then at home, Hyun-ji sees that the woman she saw earlier is a ghost and it is snooping at her, which confirms her that she's able to see ghosts (It is because she spent a long time in a limbo stage). She then calls Bong-pal that she can see ghosts and doesn't know what to do. Then Bong-pal reassures her that he'll protect her from now on.
14	"Episode 14"; Transliteration: "Part 14" (Korean: 제14회)	Unknown	Unknown	August 23, 2016
Bong-pal and Hyun-ji discuss how he felt when he saw a ghost for the first time, and how he overcome his fear with a help from Myung-cheol. Bong-pal reveals to Myung-cheol that Hyun-ji can see ghosts. A hunter finds Park Ji-hoon's corpse. Cheon-sang and In-rang get tasked by Myung-cheol to be Bong-pal's bodyguards. At the gym, they try to show Hyun-ji some self-defense moves, but she's already proficient in it. Hyun-ji's mother starts packing up because their temporary home is sold. Myung-cheol gets notified about Park Ji-hoon's case, and he confirms his identity. He then notifies Bong-pal, who's in utter disbelief about that his father died. Bong-pal then fills out the autopsy request form, after the police finds out that he died the same way as Noh Hyun-joo. Bong-pal then goes to the funeral ceremony of his father. Hyun-ji gets notified by Myung-cheol, who then stops her assignment with Hye-sung, who drives her there. At the memorial tablet, Hyun-ji tells Myung-cheol that she remembers Ji-hoon's task, but she cannot recall where did she put it. Then, Myung-cheol sees Hye-sung at the memorial place, then he berates him for what did he do, then they have a fight, and the ghost inside Hye-sung details that all it did was just to "save" him when he was a kid, because he was being bullied and had an abusive father whom he hated. After the ghost invaded his body, it started its killing spree with one of the bullies, then Hye-sung threatens Myung-cheol. The autopsy results are in at the police station, and it is detailing that Ji-hoon had the blood of his attacker under his fingernails. At home, a grieving Bong-pal checks the letters that his father sent him. Myung-cheol gives his scimitar to the virgin bodhisattva to make an inscription to it that will make it into a spirit weapon. Hyun-ji, after telling Bong-pal that their temporary house is sold, walks by Hye-sung's clinic, who then invites her to a tea. Detective Yang visits Bong-pal, and tells him that according to the autopsy report, his father is likely have been murdered by Hye-sung. He then calls Myung-cheol, who tells him that Hye-sung is possessed by the evil spirit that was banished from his body and is looking for the spirit weapon her mother made just in case Then, Hyun-ji realizes that her tea was laced with a sedative, and while near a wall, she recalls that Hye-sung caused her car accident, then she passes out. Meanwhile, Bong-pal is running to check Hyun-ji's whereabouts.
15	"Episode 15"; Transliteration: "Part 15" (Korean: 제15회)	Unknown	Unknown	August 29, 2016
Cheon-sang and In-rang are on a stakeout near Hye-sung's clinic then they notice that he has loaded something into his car, then they follow him to a parking lot. Meanwhile, Bong-pal is running to Hye-sung's clinic, smashes its door open, and sees Hyun-ji's necklace on the floor. The police started the search and rescue for Hyun-ji, then they take samples from Hye-sung's cup at his clinic, and notify Hyun-ji's mother. At the parking lot, Cheon-sang and In-rang are snooping on Hye-sung, and In-rang notices that he has taken Hyun-ji, which he exclaim, but is noticed by Hye-sung. Then they have the heat off them when the parking lot patroller orders him to leave the parking lot, then Cheon-sang and In-rang witness Hye-sung killing the patroller, then In-rang informs Bong-pal, and the police is on the way to the scene. Myung-cheol informs Bong-pal that the reason why the evil spirit is obsessed with invading his body is that her mother's spiritual energy has been handed down to him, and while the spirit weapon is fully intact, it cannot do anything to him. Hye-sung's mother gets questioned at the police station. In-rang extracts the target location of Hye-sung from his car GPS, which is an abandoned warehouse. After her questioning, Myung-cheol asks Hye-sung's mother about her son's "changing", and she then reveals how her son become what he is now. At the abandoned warehouse, Hye-sung threatens Hyun-ji, who is forced to reveal the location of the package, but manages to leave her phone back at the location, with the message containing the package's address, which is found by Bong-pal and his friends. Myung-cheol goes to the virgin bodhisattva, where they discuss about Hye-sung, then he receives the upgraded scimitar, with the inscription on it. Then Bong-pal and Myung-cheol meet up at the Myungsung University metro station, where they face off against Hye-sung, with Myung-cheol unleashing the empowered scimitar's power to separate the evil spirit from Hye-sung's body, which makes Hye-sung collapse. Hyun-ji races to find the spirit weapon, then the evil spirit attacks Myung-cheol who cannot hold it back any further.
16	"Final Episode"; Transliteration: "Last episode" (Korean: 마지막회)	Unknown	Unknown	August 30, 2016
Bong-pal destroys the evil spirit with the spirit weapon, then after Myung-cheol gets up, he notices that Hye-sung is still alive. Then, the officers take Hye-sung into custody. Then, back at Hyun-ji's temporary home, her mother details to Bong-pal that they leave the next day and he has to end his feelings towards Hyun-ji. He then gives her Hyun-ji's necklace to have it given to her. At the police station, Hye-sung confesses his murders and he gets detained in the prison. Bong-pal and Hyun-ji part ways until she's finished her studies and is ready for the university, and Bong-pal will try to formally get permission from her mother for dating. Then, the time passes around until Hyun-ji's test results are in. She gets visited by a trainer's ghost, who then gets sent away by her. She then informs Bong-pal that she "didn't pass". Then, Bong-pal is thinking about what to do. At the first day of his class, Bong-pal looks at his new study group. Then outside, he gets informed by Cheon-sang that Sundae Soup is at the verge of disbanding again, because the former members (In-rang and Lim Seo-yeon) have graduated, and no new freshmen are willing to join it. He then receives a call from In-rang, who turned their club into a real business. Myung-cheol runs into a woman who he thinks is a fake virgin bodhisattva, and gets brought into the police station. At the police station, Detective Yang is now promoted into the Chief, then Myung-cheol gets questioned. Bong-pal gets asked by his new study group members to check out the new freshman party, and at the party, he sees that Hyun-ji passed, but she wanted to surprise him. Myung-cheol calls Bong-pal to get him out of custody at the police, after the events with the fake bodhisattva. Bong-pal then tells him to retire as a monk and live with him because he's the only family he has now. Hyun-ji joins a blind date event with the other girls in her class, but after Bong-pal gets notified by In-rang that she's there, he gets into the event and introduces himself and leaves with Hyun-ji. He then goes home with Hyun-ji and formally asks her mother to date with Hyun-ji, and agrees with him. Hye-sung reconciles with his mother by giving her a pendant. Myung-cheol saves the apartment's woman president when she trips on a bottle. Hyun-ji bumps into a woman named Se-ri who looks familiar to her and sees that she has three boyfriends trying to reconcile with her. Then, after a long discussion, Hyun-ji and Bong-pal decide to work at Sundae Soup.

== Original soundtrack ==
Hey Ghost! Let's Fight OST

Soundtrack album by Various artists
- Recorded: 2016
- Genre: Soundtrack
- Languages: Korean; English
- Label: CJ E&M

=== Part 1 ===
No.	Title	Artist	Length
1.	"Only See You" (너만 보여)	Ryu Ji-hyun & Kim Min-ji	3:03
2.	"Only See You" (Inst.)		3:03
Total length:			6:06

=== Part 2 ===
No.	Title	Artist	Length
1.	"Midnight Run"	Pia	3:16
2.	"Midnight Run" (Inst.)		3:16
Total length:			6:32

=== Part 3 ===
No.	Title	Artist	Length
1.	"Coincidence" (우연한 일들)	Kim So-hee (C.I.V.A) & Song Yuvin	4:03
2.	"Coincidence" (Inst.)		4:03
Total length:			8:06

=== Part 4 ===
No.	Title	Artist	Length
1.	"Console Myself" (나를 위로해)	Rocoberry	3:30
2.	"Console Myself" (Inst.)		3:30
Total length:			7:00

=== Part 5 ===
No.	Title	Artist	Length
1.	"Dream" (꿈)	Kim So-hyun	3:33
2.	"Dream" (Inst.)		3:33
Total length:			7:06

=== Part 6 ===
No.	Title	Artist	Length
1.	"U & I"	Sumin	3:32
2.	"U & I" (Inst.)		3:32
Total length:			7:04

Disc 2:
No.	Title	Artist	Length
1.	"Let's Fight Ghost Title"	Roh Hyoung-woo	2:37
2.	"Fight with Ghost"	Roh Hyoung-woo	1:25
3.	"Ghost Four"	Park Eun-ji	2:32
4.	"Chungsang and Illang"	Lee Ah-ram	2:24
5.	"Hello Ghost"	Lee Tae-hyun	2:31
6.	"Dancing with a Ghost"	Choi In-young	2:23
7.	"Ghost Cowboy"	Lee Seung-taek & Yang Byeong-bong	2:08
8.	"Ghost Hunting"	Ma Sang-woo	3:21
9.	"Hyunji and Bongpal"	Roh Hyoung-woo	2:15
Total length:			21:36

== Ratings ==
In this table, the blue numbers represent the lowest ratings and the red numbers represent the highest.

Ep.	Original broadcast date	Average audience share		
Ep.	Original broadcast date	AGB Nielsen		TNmS
Ep.	Original broadcast date	Nationwide	Seoul	Nationwide
1	July 11, 2016	4.055%	5.228%	3.6%
2	July 12, 2016	4.063%	4.473%	4.2%
3	July 18, 2016	3.515%	4.237%	3.4%
4	July 19, 2016	3.866%	3.937%	3.7%
5	July 25, 2016	3.493%	3.559%	3.0%
6	July 26, 2016	3.379%	4.143%	4.2%
7	August 1, 2016	2.393%	2.122%	3.6%
8	August 2, 2016	3.668%	3.555%	5.1%
9	August 8, 2016	2.848%	3.100%	3.4%
10	August 9, 2016	3.630%	4.202%	4.3%
11	August 15, 2016	3.029%	3.883%	3.6%
12	August 16, 2016	3.178%	3.800%	3.7%
13	August 22, 2016	2.135%	1.824%	2.3%
14	August 23, 2016	3.492%	3.893%	4.1%
15	August 29, 2016	3.247%	4.092%	3.3%
16	August 30, 2016	4.311%	4.755%	5.3%
Average		3.394%	3.800%	3.8%

- This drama airs on a cable channel/pay TV which normally has a relatively smaller audience compared to free-to-air TV/public broadcasters (KBS, SBS, MBC and EBS).

== Adaptations ==
A Thai remake, titled Let's Fight Ghost was broadcast in Thailand in the first half of 2021 by True Asian Series, True4U, and NETFLIX; it stars Suppapong Udomkaewkanjana and Patchanan Jiajirachote of BNK48.
