= Egg ghost =

Supernatural entity in Korean urban legends

Egg ghost refers to dalgyal gwisin (Korean: 달걀귀신), a type of Korean ghost. Its name comes from its resemblance to an egg. It does not have arms, legs, nor a head, not even eyes, nose, or mouth. Legend says that when a person sees an egg ghost, they will die. Its origin and personality are not significant. Rumor has it that some of egg ghosts' personalities are not incorruptible as time goes by. Or that egg ghosts change to an egg, hide themselves, and come out when they want.

Some scholars interpret that egg ghosts are a kind of mujagui (Korean: 무자귀, hanja: 無子鬼) (literally, a "childless ghost"), which have no descendants or relatives to hold an ancestor memorial service for them.

== See also ==
- Kumiho
- Korean mythology
