= Gwisin =

Ghosts in Korean folklore

- Hangul: 귀신
- Hanja: 鬼神
- RR: gwisin
- MR: kwisin

In Korean folklore, Gwisin (Korean: 귀신) are a type of deity, divinity, spirit or ghost. They are considered similar to a yogoe (Korean: 요괴) or mamul (Korean: 마물). Unlike dokkaebi, gwisin are humans who have died.

According to folklore, gwisin may be found in many places. It is claimed that when an individual dies but still has ties to the world of the living, such as in the case of revenge or caring for a loved one, their spirit remains on earth to complete the task before going on to the underworld.

== Legends ==
There are a lot of legends about gwisin. Because they are a common form of ghost, children often make them up to scare others or parents tell stories to their children to teach them a lesson. The most common plot of a legend about gwisin is revenge, for example revenge for the family of the ghost. Another popular trope includes men who cheat on their wives, and murder someone.

According to folklore, gwisin may be found in many places. It is claimed that when an individual dies but still has ties to the world of the living, such as in the case of revenge or caring for a loved one, their spirit remains on earth to complete the task before going on to the underworld.

Appearances of gwisin often occur in high schools, a concept popularized with the release of Whispering Corridors, a Korean horror movie released in 1998.

=== Characteristics ===
There are different types of gwisin. Folklore says that the gwisin ghosts are usually transparent, legless and float in mid-air. The Cheonyeo-gwisin (처녀귀신) is the gwisin of a woman who died unmarried and usually have white Hanbok (한복) which are worn for funerals. They have long, drooping black hair and sometimes they are faceless, depending on their personality. The Chonggak-gwisin (총각귀신) is the male version of cheonyeo-gwisin. They are men who died unmarried, and although common, in popular culture they are somewhat rare, and may appear different. The Mul-gwisin (물귀신) is the spirit of someone who drowned. They are often blamed for dragging innocent people into the water out of jealousy or loneliness. The Wonhan gwisin (원한 귀신) is the gwisin of someone who died unjustly. The Sarin-gwisin (살인귀신) is specifically someone who was killed. Jasal gwisin (자살귀신) is the spirit of someone who took their own life. A well known method of preventing danger from gwisin is taking a strainer and hanging it above one's house. Another is by taking a hair, burning it, and scattering the ashes around the courtyard.

== See also ==
- Egg ghost
- Korean virgin ghost
- Hi Bye, Mama! (TV series)
- Hotel del Luna (TV series)
- Revenant (TV series)
- White Lady (ghost)

== Sources ==
- Kim, Chongho (2018) [2003]. Korean Shamanism: The Cultural Paradox. London and New York: Routledge. ISBN 978-1-138-71051-1.
- Yun, Kyoim (2019). The Shaman's Wages: Trading in Ritual on Cheju Island. Korean Studies of the Henry M. Jackson School of International Studies. Seattle: University of Washington Press. ISBN 978-0-295-74595-4.
