= Korean folklore =

Aspect of Korean culture

Stories and practices that are considered part of Korean folklore go back several thousand years. These tales derive from a variety of origins, including Korean Shamanism, Confucianism, Buddhism, and more recently Christianity.

Many folk traditions developed in rural areas such as villages. They often relate to households and farming, and reinforce family and communal bonds. The performance of folk tales reflects this, with performers often encouraging and eliciting audience involvement. Traditions and stories were passed down orally, although written examples appear beginning in the 5th century.

While many traditions have become less practiced or modernized, folklore remains deeply embedded in Korean society, continuing to influence fields such as religion, stories, art, and customs.

== Types of folklore ==
There are many types of folklore in Korean culture, including Imuldam (이물담), focused on supernatural beings such as monsters, goblins and ghosts. The most common beings are the Gwisin (귀신), which are similar to deities, divinities, spirits or ghosts, and the Dokkaebi (도깨비), which are legendary creatures sometimes considered "Korean goblins". However, this term differs from the European concept in that they do not possess an evil or demonic characteristic. Instead, they are creatures with powers that seek to bring people both delight and misery. These beings engage either in friendly or annoying behavior with humans. The presence of these beings is considered related to both difficulties and pleasures in life.

Today stories are derived from a variety of origins, including Shamanism, Confucianism, Buddhism and more recently Christianity. Korean folklore began to be organized after folklore lectures were started by Cho Chi-hun.

== Folk religion ==
Korean folk religion (민속신앙) remains a part of the lives of modern Koreans. Korean folk religions are based on Korean shamanism and foreign religions such as Buddhism. Korean folk religions changed in nature and characteristics due to cultural infusion as foreign religions were introduced to Korea, and folk religions gradually developed as a mixture of foreign religions and indigenous beliefs. Korean folk religions are not individual beliefs, but are expressed through a community, having developed within local villages and homes. Korean shamans are involved in both the worship of household deities and rituals dedicated to village patron gods.

In Korean folklore, houses are sacred places filled with the traditions of family members and ancestors. It is believed that there is a guardian deity in every place in the house, and that they bring good fortune to the family. For example, there is a god in charge of the house that helps bring in wealth, and a goddess in the master bedroom who helps give birth to babies and protects offspring. Evil spirits outside the house cause anxiety and fear, discouraging others from entering the house. There is thus a custom to restrict the entry of evil spirits by hanging thorn trees on the gate or by setting up ritual strings to prevent evil spirits from entering the house. The gods of the house confront these evil spirits and act as guardians of the house.

The village cult is an extension of the worship of household gods. The village is an extension of the family and a place where relatives live, although villages can also contain people who are not involved in the worship of the patron gods. The gods of the village cults differ depending on the characteristics of the village. Village cults are generally limited to one village, but sometimes they are extended out of the village to perform farming rituals or communal rites between multiple villages. Most villages serve one main god, who is accompanied by Jangseung (장승, Korean totem pole) or other small subordinate gods. Korean shamanism has been looked down on by adherents of other religions, but has over time incorporated and imitated the form and organization of foreign religions such as Buddhism and Confucianism. Foreign religions in turn absorbed elements of shamanism. Shaminism also developed a complementary relationship with Confucianism. Shamanism dealt with abnormal and irregular problems, while Confucian beliefs dealt with regular and everyday problems. Korean shamanism includes rituals used to release rancor from bitter souls and expel bad luck from houses.

== Folk literature ==
Folk literature is closely related to Korean culture. Most literature was passed down verbally, and revolves around the lives and customs of the Korean people. Such literature includes shamanic songs, myths, tales and folktales. There is variation in these stories, reflecting the periods of history in which they were formed. Many also have a community cultural character and are closely related to the production culture. Some literature is in metrical verse, while others are in prose form. Fragmentary written evidence of Korean folk literature can be found as far back as the 5th century, while complete stories preserved in writing exist from the 12th and 13th centuries in the Buddhist priest Iryeon's compendium Samguk yusa.

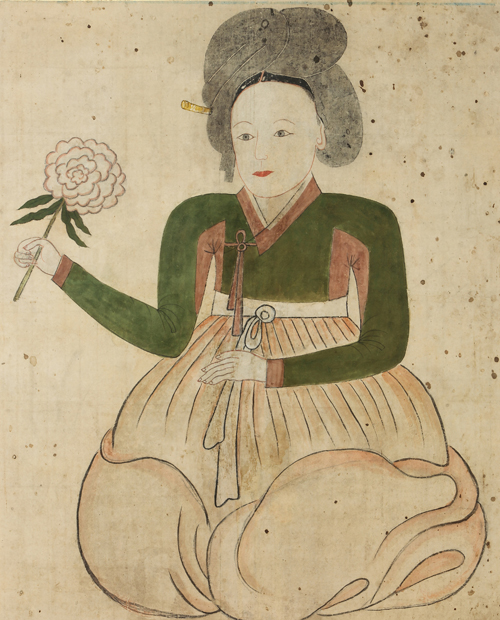
Princess Bari holding the flower of resurrection. Painting for shamanic rituals, eighteenth century.

Shamanic songs consist of both songs with narrative content about the gods, recited for ritual purposes, and non-narrative hymns addressed or dedicated to the gods. Both are traditionally passed down from shaman to shaman. One of the best-known examples of the former is the Princess Bari narrative. Most versions recount of a Korean princess abandoned by her parents for being the seventh daughter of a son-less king. Many years later, her parents fall ill, and the only cure is medicinal water from the Western Heaven. The abandoned princess is rediscovered and agrees to help her parents when the other daughters will not. She travels to the afterlife, where she marries the guardian of the medicinal water and bears him (often seven) sons. She usually returns at her parents’ funeral, revives them with flowers of resurrection she has picked from the afterlife, and cures them with the water. The narrative commonly concludes with her becoming a deity connecting the living and the dead. The Princess Bari narrative is recited only in funeral ceremonies. The myth is generally understood as subverting the Confucian doctrines of patriarchy and age-ordered hierarchy through the Confucian value of filial piety; it is not the eldest son but the youngest daughter who manages to save her parents.

== Social folk custom ==
Korean folk customs are a significant part of Korean culture. They include a strong belief in the importance of family, community and society. These beliefs are expressed during social practices such as family reunions and weddings. In some Western cultures, a person's lifelong rites are classified as birth, a coming-of-age ceremony, a wedding ceremony, and a funeral service. However, Korean customs emphasized the role of the family community and members of society, with birth being less important and filial piety after funerals being an important aspect of a person's life.

=== The Four Ceremonial Occasions ===
In East Asian custom following the ancient Chinese Book of Rites, there are four rites of passage which occur throughout an individual's lifetime: the capping ceremony that marks the coming of age, the wedding, the funeral, and the ancestral rites. These events represent changes in an individual's social position throughout his or her life. After being born and supported by parents, they become adults, marry, and take care of family members. When they get old, they are supported as respected elders and die. In East Asia, these four rituals were grouped together as the Four Ceremonial Occasions, emphasizing the significance of changes in life and minimizing the confusion it brings.

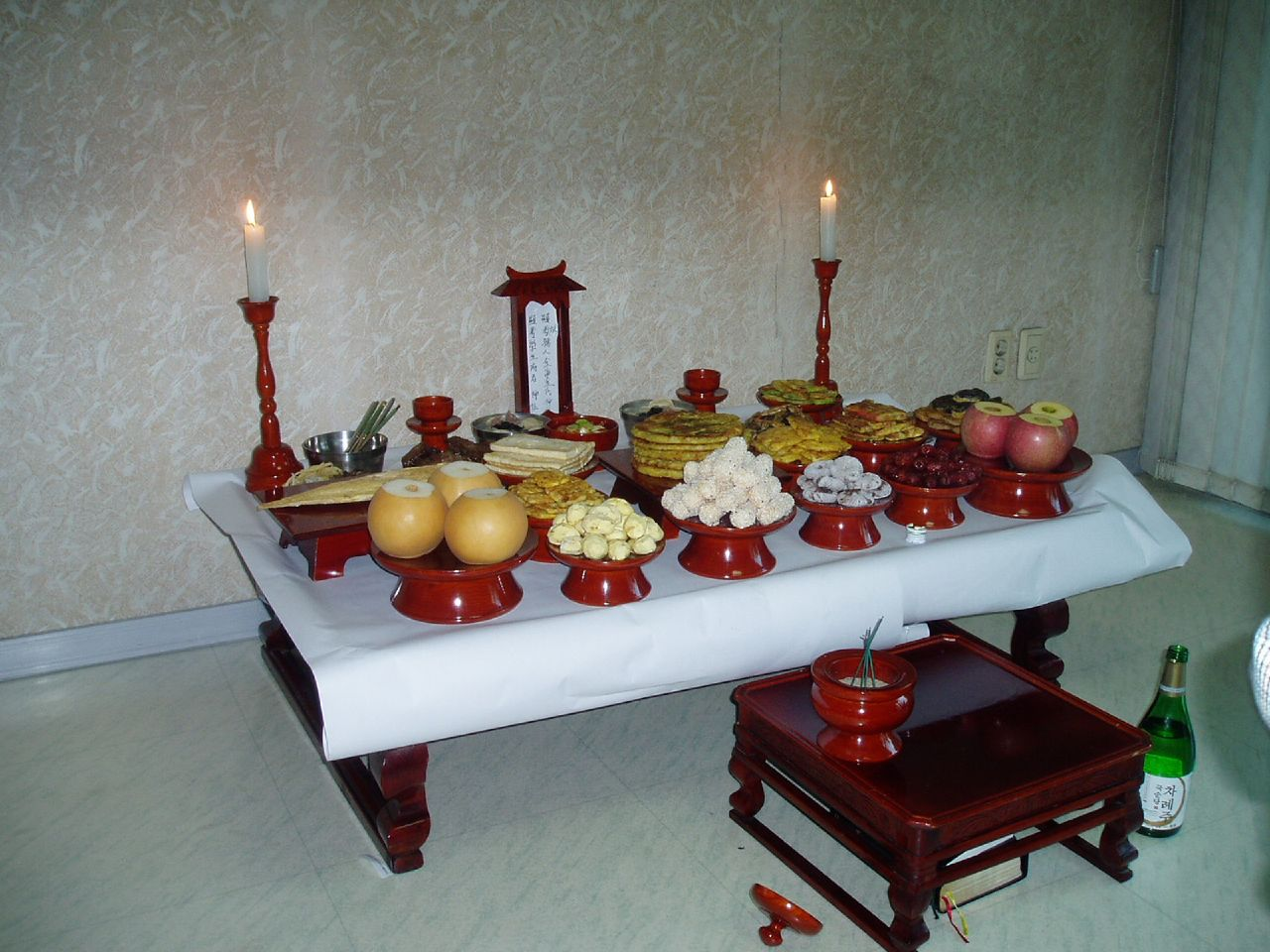
A traditional Korean table set for Jerye (Jesa)

The capping ceremony was the coming-of-age ceremony, which marked the entry of adult from the world of childhood. People were recognized as full members of society after they went through this custom. It was traditional to wear a cap with a topknot on during this event. The second important occasion was the marriage. There were rituals for discussing marriage, exchanging gifts and exchanging letters. Marriages were arranged by families rather than made out of love. Funerals involved a strict system of mourning robes, and there was a system of wearing mourning robes and residing next to the parent's grave for three years, again based on Chinese precedent. Confucian-style burial and Buddhist-style cremation coexisted and continue to coexist. Following Confucian protocol, the ancestral rites—performed to commemorate the deceased on death anniversaries and on major holidays—were held for the great-great-grandparents, who were the oldest generation of ancestors that someone could plausibly have known personally. In East Asian custom, the definition of unmarrigeable kin extends to those who share the same great-great-grandparent.

During these four occasions, family members and village members actively cooperated, so they were able to foster community ties. However, the capping ceremony was gradually extinguished while Korea was under Japanese rule. Traditional family rituals were steadily restricted to rural areas, while in urban areas the events became simplified. After Korea's liberation from Japan's colonial rule, the traditional family system, which values ancestor worship, collapsed, placing more importance on weddings and sixtieth birthday celebrations for the living than on rituals for deceased ancestors. In the 1960s, as industrialization and urbanization were promoted, professional businesses such as wedding halls and funeral parlors were developed, and rituals were held outside the home. Along with the economic development, weddings, sixtieth birthdays, and funerals in particular became very luxurious and costly, which many Koreans consider a societal issue.

=== Social folk customs in daily life ===
A once dominant Confucian culture that emphasizes respect for ancestors, age and seniority has affected South Korea's home and workplace practices, and its social life. In addition to other factors such as economic status and status at the business level, age and marital status play a role in determining social status. These factors, especially age, affect relationships between social acquaintances. Folk customs related to family or farming have changed into other forms or disappeared little by little as industrialization proceeds.

Jerye (Jesa) remains an important custom for Korean people. Koreans perform Jesa on the day of their ancestors' death, on Korean new year, and on Chuseok (추석, Autumn eve). The unity of the family community is strengthened because all families must gather together to prepare and hold events together during Jesa.

One food-related custom is gimjang. Many Koreans make a large amount of kimchi when the temperature drops in late fall. In spring, each household ferments seafood such as shrimp and anchovies with salt. In summer, they buy a thousand-day salt which is used to store the foodstuff for two to three years until its bitter taste is gone. In late summer, red peppers are dried and ground into powder. In late fall, housewives decide the right date for kimchi in part through consideration of the weather. Innovative techniques and creative ideas are shared and accumulated through the custom of sharing kimchi at home after making kimchi. This custom helped foster community ties, as family members and village members gathered together to make kimchi.

== Folk arts ==
Korean folk arts have often been passed down within Korean society. Korean folk art is characterized by many works satirizing the upper class and high society.

=== Minhwa ===
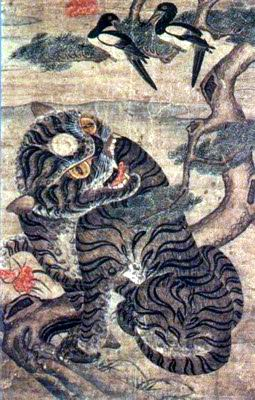
Magpie and tiger, Author unknown, Joseon dynasty

Minhwa, or folk paintings, is a popular painting genre, noted for lacking consistent perspective and being fluid in their style. They are contrasted with the styles of paintings created by professional painters. Painting related to the public's desire to chase away bad ghosts and face a happy occasion, paintings to decorate the inside and outside of the house, and paintings directly related to everyday life such as folding screens, scrolls, and murals made up the mainstream of folk paintings.

Minhwa was used to decorate the living and ceremonial spaces of the private sector during the Joseon dynasty. After securing marketability through economic growth after the late Joseon dynasty, it was distributed through the market in the early 20th century. Since Minhwa originated from imitating paintings of court and other high-class demand, most of the plants were similarly painted on the subject. Traditional Korean paintings depict stories or events of historical and cultural significance, conveying popular metaphors and symbols. Common topics include overcoming evil, landscape paintings, and portraits. Minhwa have also been known to cover these topics, with subjects ranging from themes that repel evil to sentimental topics such as landscape painting, characterization, and botanical painting, as well as old stories and myths.

Painters and painting styles of Minhwa vary depending on the order, the demander and the purpose of the painting. The paintings by orders from the upper middle class were painted by a skilled professional painter using good materials, and many of them are large in size. The paintings by private demand were painted by Buddhist monks or wandering painters, using materials readily available from the private sector, and there are many paintings with strong individuality as they can reveal the subject of the painting rather than follow certain forms and forms, or as a popular painting style in the private sector. Minhwa may not have been professionally painted, but stories on the subject were handed down along with the paintings, and conveying a certain theme was prioritized over artistic style.

=== Pansori ===
Pansori (pan meaning "a place where people gather", and sori meaning "sound") is a form of storytelling through music, which originated in south-west Korea. Characteristics include expressive singing, stylized speech, and gesture. Alongside the singer there is a drummer. Over time the stories told through this form have diversified, leading to the format expanding in popularity to high class social groups. Traditionally spontaneous, it has become increasingly rigid as oral storytelling is replaced by written literature. During these performances, the audience is encouraged to themselves become participants in the music. The tendency for improvisation enables the audience to become involved in the performance, with one factor in successful performance being good audience participation. Audience participation is so important that it is sometimes deliberately added to pansori performances that had been recorded in studios after the fact. The origins of individual pansori stories is unknown, although it is suspected that they adapted existing tales into song.

=== Folk dances ===
A variety of folk dances exist. As is common with Korean cultural traditions, many are associated with rural areas. Traditionally these rural performances take place either in the marketplace or in farmers' fields. Some satirize the upper class and elite sectors of historical society. Other origins include shamanic ritual dances, and dances associated with particular objects.

==== Talchum ====
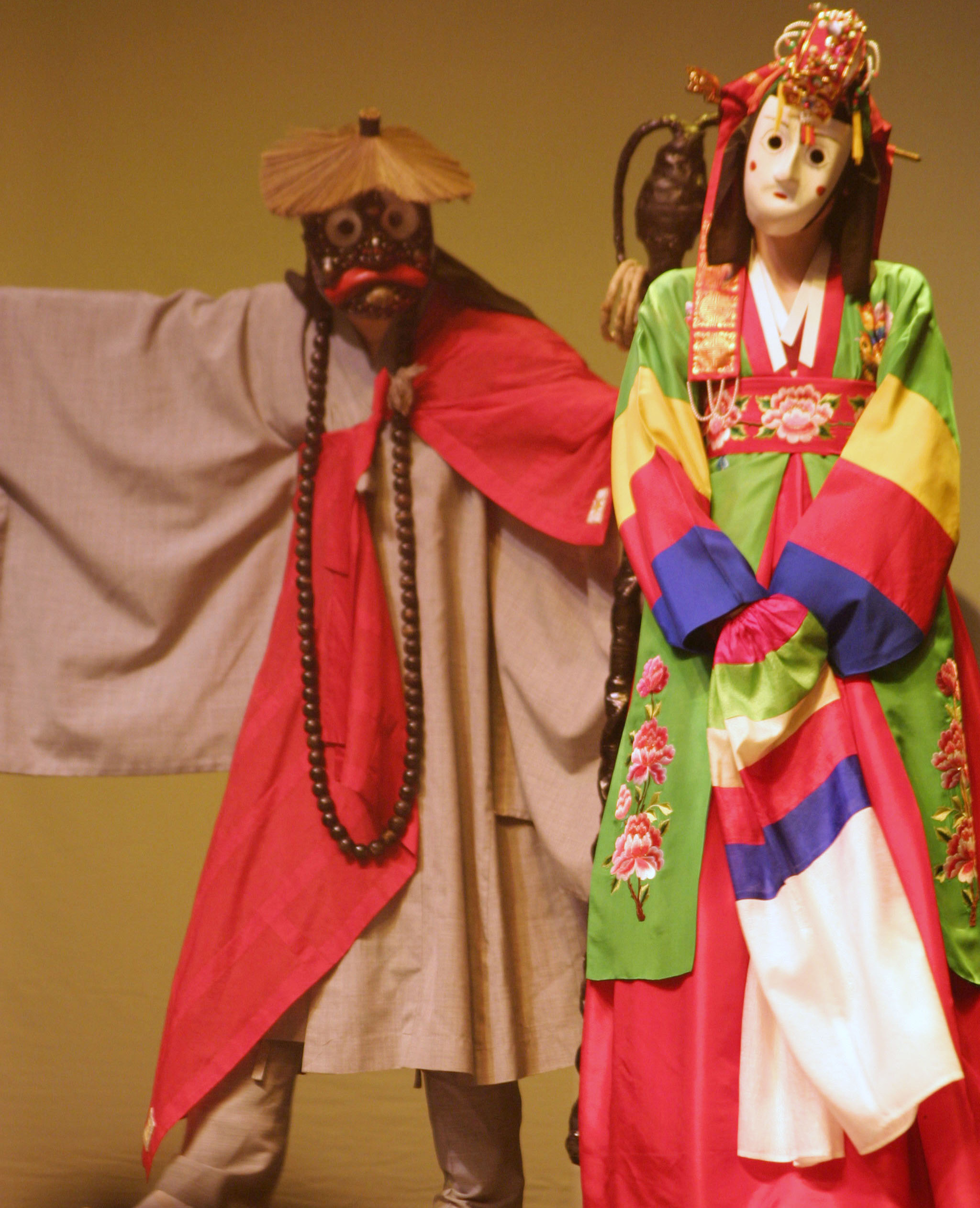
Bongsan Talchum, A Bride and A Monk

The talchum is a drama which involves dancing and singing while wearing traditional masks. The dances consist of several acts, although these acts may represent different disconnected stories. Satire is a common form of storytelling, and is used to criticise the nobility, flawed religious individuals, and the patriarchy. While the term was originally regional, it has become associated with masked dancing throughout Korea. Outside of Hwanghae Province, where the term originated, other regions have their own names for similar dance forms. Instrumental accompaniments vary per region. Performances do not require a stage, and are thus often performed outdoors. Audience participation is a common and encouraged part of the performance, and dancers actively seek to interact with the audience throughout the performance. Despite the serious themes running through many performances, they are interspersed with humor and usually end positively. Twelve different forms of the dance have been designated "Important Intangible Cultural Properties of Korea", including dances that originated in both of what is now North and South Korea. Additional forms of dances have been further classified as intangible cultural heritage of specific provinces.

Talchum was first associated with nature's imitation, farming, sexual activity, or faith in defeating ghosts. It has gradually been developed to include symbolic movements that express opinions on various topics, and artistic expressions have developed into a popular aesthetic. Structural characteristics and gestures associated with these vary depending on the region.

== Women in Korean folklore ==
In Korean folklore, there are a few legends that touch of the idea of feminism and the role of women in these tales.

Legend of Arang (Joseon era): The Legend of Arang tells the story of a magistrate's daughter, who is tricked by her nanny to go outside at night after which she was raped and killed. Her ghost haunts future magistrates, killing them from shock, until one survives and with the ghost's help identifies Arang's killer.

Kumiho: Kumiho is a nine-tailed fox that appears in various Korean folktales. When this fox transforms itself into a human, it becomes a woman. One prominent trait of this woman is its evil personality, with earning the affection of the King and using this power to commit evil deeds. Her eventual death at the hand of a three-legged dog represents heaven's rejection of the kingdom she had taken over, and was likely created to justify the overthrowing of a king at some point in history. The motive for these women is to ascend to a higher being. It is said if they absorb enough souls or avoid eating human livers they can ascend to a higher being which is most of the time, human. There have been stories where these women fall in love and stop themselves from eating so they can become human and be with their lover.

A genre of Korean folklore concerns wives who wield superhuman powers of insight. For instance, one legend tells of a strong-willed wife who was a master of janggi or Korean chess. She insisted on teaching her husband janggi until he became famous as the best player in all Seoul. One day, a rich man bet his entire fortune that he could beat the husband. The wife followed her husband to the game and constantly gave him advice until he won the game. She then sold all the fortune to buy armor and weapons. The Japanese invaded soon afterwards, but the woman's family was able to defeat them with the weapons she had bought in preparation.

The following are a collection of folk tales with female protagonists, highlighting the importance of women in Korean culture and shamanistic rituals.

Lady Myeongwol from "Song of Sun and Moon"

This domestic type tale showcases the struggles of married life. The husband makes foolish decisions that cause trouble for the couple, but the wise wife finds a way to solve their troubles so they can stay together until they die. After death they become the God of the Sun and Goddess of the Moon. This tale shows, like many shamanic tales, the female as smart and skilled and the male as foolish and unskilled.(Dae, N.D.)

Danggeumaegi from "Myth of Maiden Danggeum"

This is the tale of a daughter from a noble family who was impregnated by a monk and gives birth to triplets who go on to become the Three Gods of Jeseok. After her death, she becomes the goddess of birth and agriculture along with being a protector goddess of villages.

Jacheongbi from "Segyeongbonpuri" or "Chach'ongbi Agriculture Goddess"

A Heroine tale of the creation of the earth goddess, Jimosin, showcases the origins of farming (Jwa, N.D), the conflict of the sexes, and how the combining of male and female leads to prosperity and fertility. Jacheongbi goes to heaven to find her lover and after being tested and passing she is able to marry him. She stopped a riot and was awarded five grains, She and her husband returned to earth and she became a goddess.(Choi, 2008)

Paridegi (the Seventh Princess) from "Goddess Who Guides Dead Souls to the Underworld"

This tale is of the origin of the goddess of shaman who guides the dead to the afterworld. After she is cast out by her parents as a newborn, many years later when her parents become ill she is the only child with the ability to heal them.

Samsunghalmang from "The Grandmother Goddess of Birth"

Tale from Jeju Island. Tells the story of Princess of Yowanghwangjeguk, who was tasked with being the goddess of fertility to atone for her behavior. She is depicted holding flowers to convey the gender and longevity of the unborn child.

Chilsong Goddesses from "The Snake Goddess Migrated to Cheju Island"

Tale of the rite of Chilsong. They protect grains to make people rich. The tale starts with the daughter of a noble family being cast out for becoming pregnant before marriage. She is then put in a box and tossed into the water and lands on the Jeju shore. She is turned into a snake and gives birth to seven snake daughters, the seventh daughter hides under a chilsong in the yard and becomes the outdoor snake goddess and her mother becomes the indoor snake goddess. They are the protectors of grains.

== Contemporary revival ==
Recent achievements in keeping Korean folklore alive include the 150-part animated TV series, Animentary Korean Folklore (애니멘터리 한국설화), telling old tales with a traditional 2-D Korean styled animation. The Animation Korean Folklore is an animation based on Korean folk literature, and was created by faithfully following the narrative structure of the tales. "Eunbi & Kabi's Once Upon a Time" is also one of the representative animations based on Korean folklore. It was also based on Korean folk literature. Unlike Animentary Korean Folklore, it added explanatory characters to help the animation process.

A film Along with the Gods: The Two Worlds was based on Korean folk religion and folk literature. The film shows how a person meets a lawyer in the underworld and goes through seven trials. It depicts the world of the underworld, depicted in Korean shamanism and muga. Since the original cartoon of the film was a huge success, many creators in Korea have shown interest in Korean folklore.

== See also ==
- Korean culture
- Korean mythology
