= Gogeumsochong =

Korean anthology of folklore

Gogeumsochong (Korean: 고금소총) is a collection of eleven different anthologies of stories collected throughout the early to late Joseon. A replica copy of Gogeumsochong was published in 1958 by Folklore Research Association, containing 11 types of scruple and 800 pieces of plots. In 1970, a total 379 tales were collected under the same title which consisted of both Chinese-characters and Korean translations and in 2008, the entire original edition from Joseon was published in five manuals.

== History ==
A mimeograph edition of the collection’s first volume was published anonymously in 1959, which was preceded by Joseongogeumsochong, also known as, Assorted Collection of Ancient Humor from Joseon, in 1947, the first edition of which included Eosurok, Records to Chase Away Languor; the second edition including Chondamhaei, meaning, Annotated Collection of Village Tales; and the third Eomyeonsun, also called, Shield Against Languor. In 1970, a total of three hundred and seventy-nine droll tales had been collected under the title Gogeumsochong, which included both the Chinese-character texts and the Hangul translations, and in 2008, the entire original collection from Joseon was published in five volumes. The full collection comprises a total of eight hundred and twenty- two tales in eleven anthologies: one hundred and forty-six tales in Taepyeonghanhwagolgyejeon, also called the Collection of Humorous Tales of Leisure; eighty- two tales in Eomyeonsun; thirty-two in the sequel Sokeomyeonsun; ten in Chondamhaei; seventy- nine in Myeongyeopjihae, also known as the Calendar Collection of Humor; sixty-three Pasurok, or, Records to Break Languor; one hundred and twenty- nine in Eosusinhwa, or, New Tales to Chase Away Languor; forty-nine in Jindamnok, or Record of Miscellaneous Tales; eighty in Seongsupaeseol, or Miscellaneous Tales to Chase Away Languor; sixty-six in Gimun, also called, Strange Tales; and eighty- six in Gyosujapsa, called, Collection of Tales to Chase Away Languor.

== Korean folk narratives ==
The tradition of oral literature precedes the invention of writing systems and takes on great significance, especially for a people without an indigenous writing system, whose use of a writing system came late in history or remained limited. On the Korean peninsula, Chinese characters were adopted as a formal writing system during the Three Kingdoms period, but their use was limited to the ruling class and the rich tradition of folk tales and songs was transmitted by word of the month. Korean mythology was formed orally in tribal societies, performed as part of religious rituals and transmitted by word of month by ritual officiants and priests. The nation’s founding myth (geonguksinhwa), now preserved in written form, was based on orally transmitted tribal myths and revised and edited when the tribe led by the progenitor Dangun took power, for the purpose of sacralizing the newly established monarchy. Myths and legends were partially transliterated into Chinese characters and preserved in the form of steles or books, but most were transmitted orally among the people, a tradition that still lives on today. Korea’s oral literature has continuously negotiated with written literature in the creation of new literary genres and styles, and their transformation, contributing greatly to the establishment of a distinctive literary tradition. While folk narratives are basically an oral tradition, some have been preserved and transmitted in the form of written words, which are categorized as Munheonseolhwa, documented folk narratives. The oldest form of Korean folk narrative preserved in written form is from the anthology Suijeon (Tales of the Bizarre), published between late Goryeo and early Joseon. The book is said to comprise a wide range of outlandish stories and biographies, among which only a few remain today in versions printed in other publications. Samguksagi (History of the Three Kingdoms) and Samgungnyusa (Memorabilia of the Three Kingdoms), important history books from mid-Goryeo, also contain various folk narratives, especially the latter, which is sometimes classified as a folk tale anthology due to its large portion of folk narratives including myths and legends. Other books on folk narratives from Goryeo include Haedonggoseungjeon (Lives of Eminent Monks from East of the Sea); Pahanjip (Collection of Writings to Break Up Idleness); Bohanjip (Collection of Writings to Relieve Idleness); and Yeokongpaeseol (Writings of Old Man Oak).

== Conclusion ==
These accounts were subsequently ordered in 1958 by the public authority organization Folk Material Publishing Committee into the extensive book Gogeumsochong. Following halfway documentation of old oral writing through the different realms it was in mid Joseon, after experiencing huge assaults by Japan and Qing China in the sixteenth and seventeenth hundreds of years, that people accounts started to be completely joined into composed writing. Society accounts, in composed structure, convey extraordinary artistic importance as records of living souls of the past, permitting knowledge into old culture and qualities past the restrictions of reality. Simultaneously, these records additionally mirror the awareness of the individuals who do the documentation, which adds an intriguing layer to the class.
