= Kkoktu =

Korean funerary figures

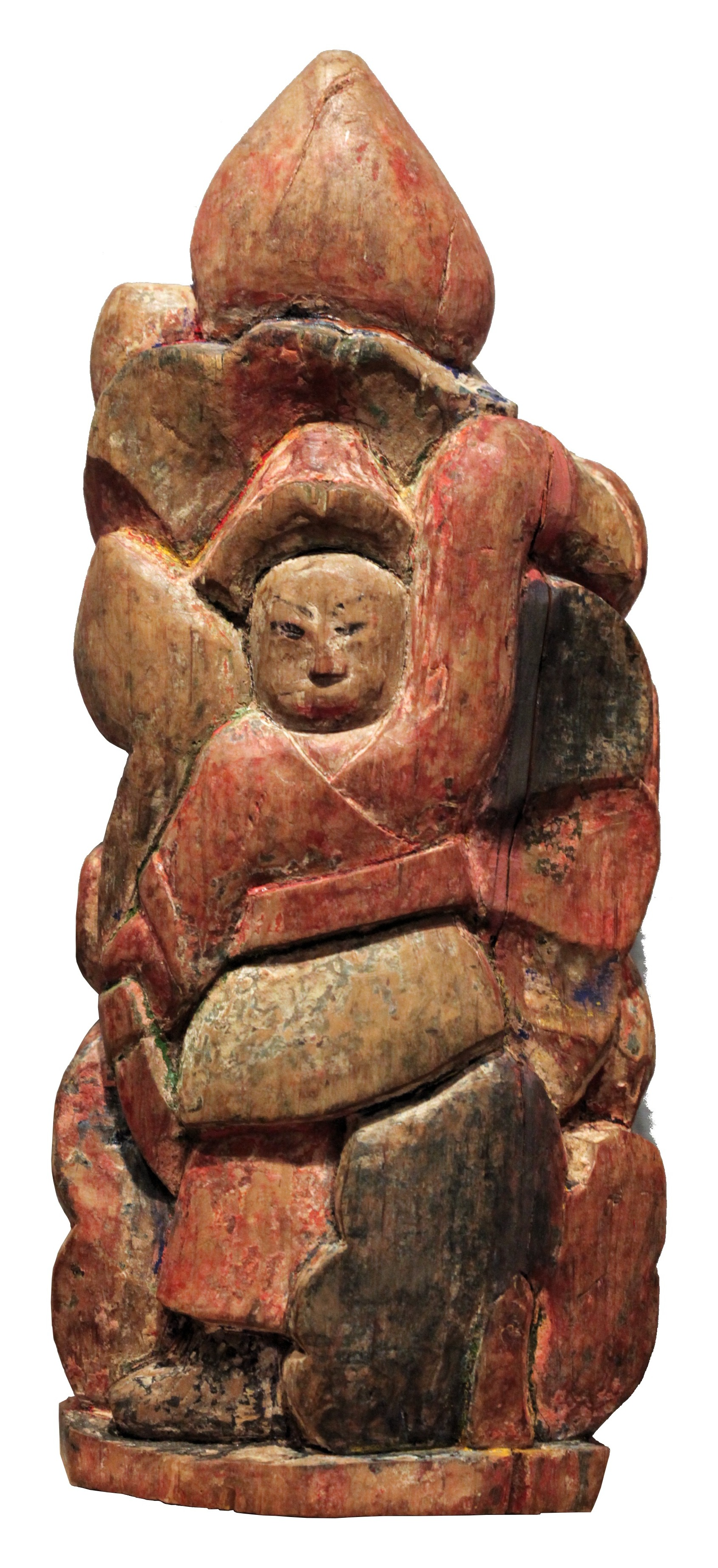
Figure of an Entertainer (here, a female dancer)

Kkoktu (Korean: 꼭두) are Korean funerary figures that protect, serve and care for the deceased in the immediate afterlife. They come in a procession that comprises a leading Guardian figure, followed by a Caregiver and an Entertainer. Figures of Dragons and Phoenixes are also common as symbols of freedom and regeneration.

In Korean mythology, the dead were believed to be in angst and confusion. To ease the experience of the afterlife, a procession of helpful figures would accompany them to guide and protect them, care for them, and entertain them. These figures were symbolised by lavishly decorated wooden servant statuettes that ornated the funeral bier, and were commonplace during the Joseon Dynasty, including for commoners. The practice came in favour in the 4th century CE and endured until the early 20th century.

The Guardian serves the dead by guiding him in the afterlife, and by driving away evil spirits. Traditionally mounted, fierce-looking and armed with swords or polearms, he later took the form of an army officer or policeman in Western-inspired attire, with a sabre.

The Caregiver serves the dead as if he was still alive, providing medical and prophylactic care. This figure is often a woman, or sometimes a couple. He comes immediately behind the Guardian in the procession.

The Entertainer fulfills a comforting role for both the spirit of the deceased and for the living who mourn them. This figure is often an acrobat or a musician.

== Gallery ==
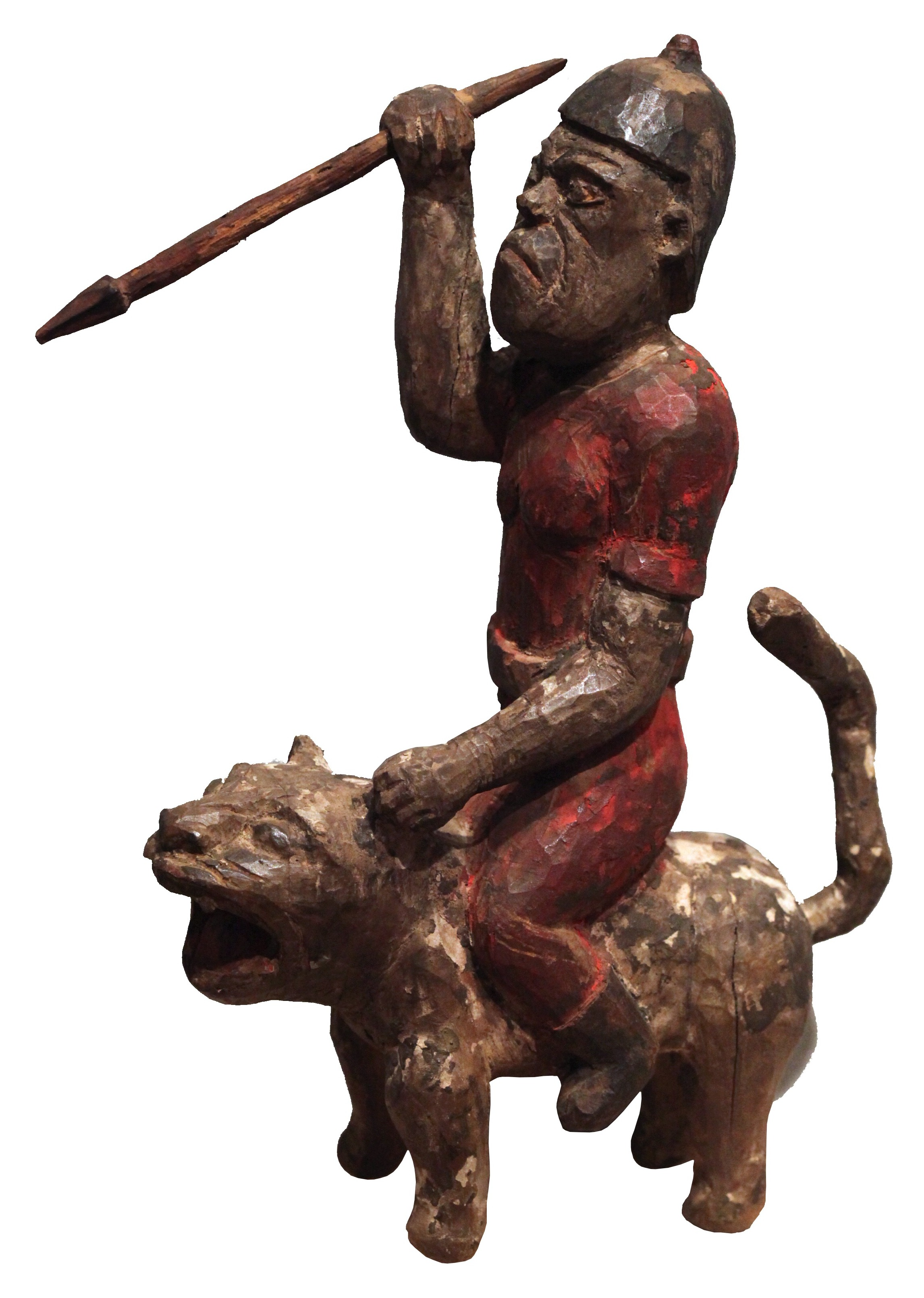
Guardian

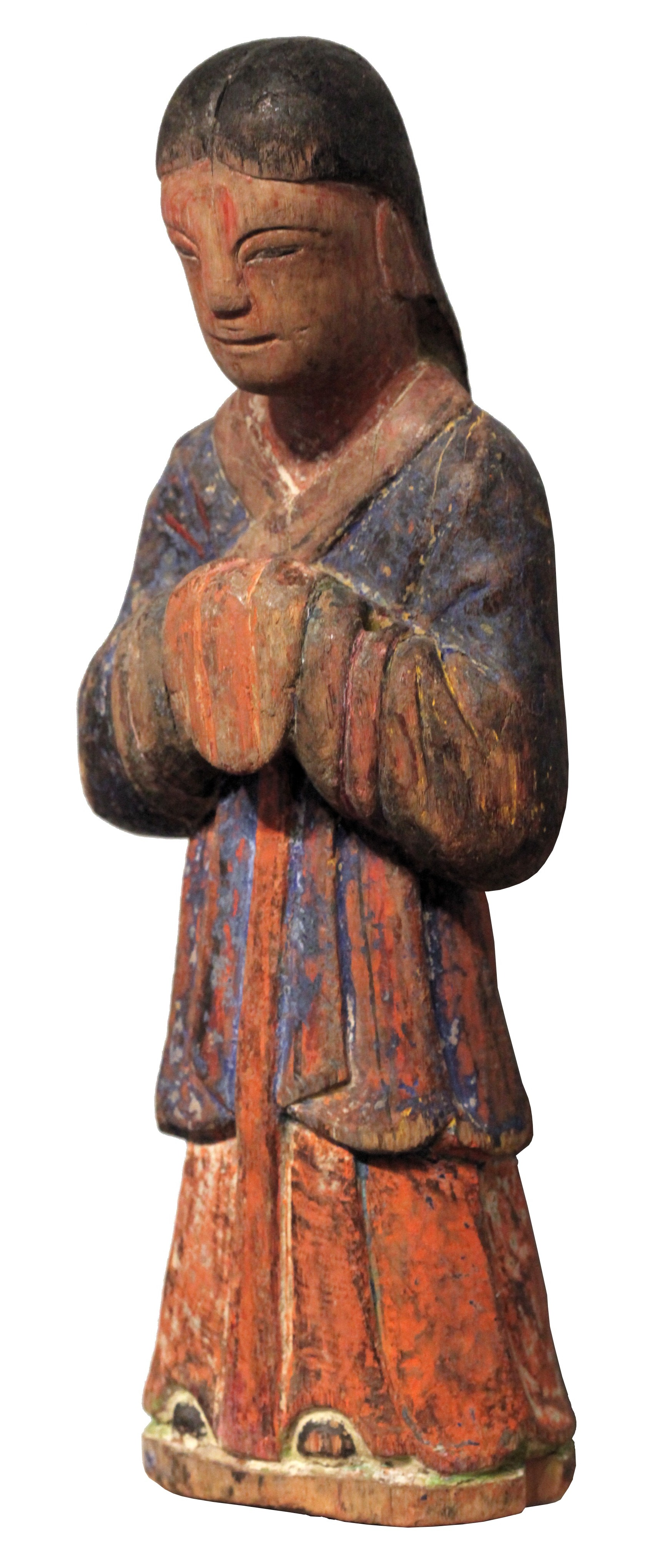
Caregiver

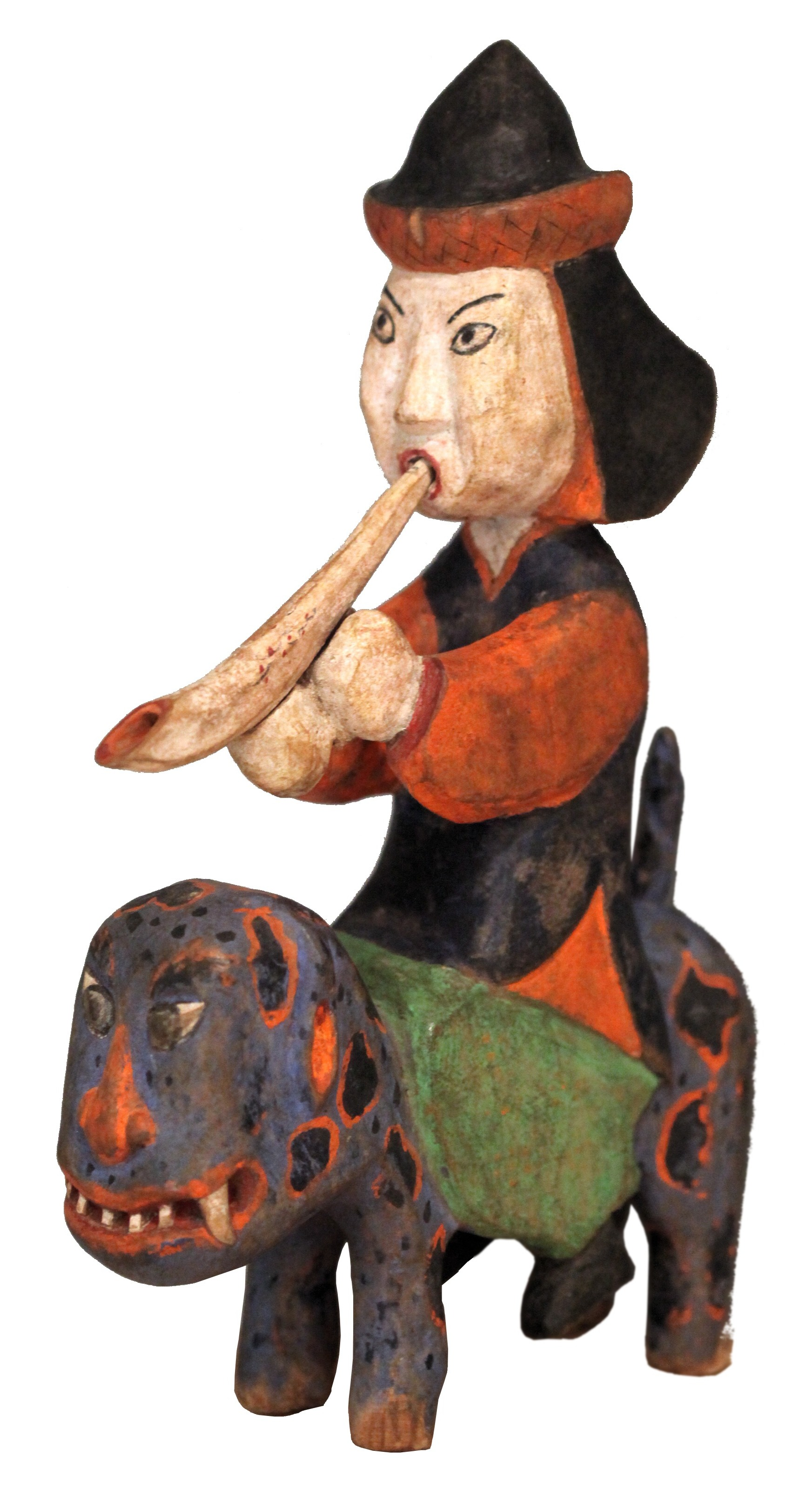
Entertainer
