= Song of Dorang-seonbi and Cheongjeong-gaksi =

Korean shamanic narrative

- Hangul: 도랑선비 청정각시 노래
- Revised Romanization: Dorang-seonbi Cheongjeong-gaksi norae
- McCune–Reischauer: Torang-sŏnbi Ch'ŏngjŏng-gaksi norae

Shaman Jang Chae-sun reciting the Song in 1981 with a cymbal in each hand

The Song of Dorang-seonbi and Cheongjeong-gaksi (Korean: 도랑선비 청정각시 노래) is a Korean shamanic narrative recited in the Mangmuk-gut, the traditional funeral ceremony of South Hamgyong Province, North Korea. It is the most ritually important and most popular of the many mythological stories told in this ritual. The Mangmuk-gut is no longer performed in North Korea, but the ritual and the narrative are currently being passed down by a South Korean community descended from Hamgyong refugees.

Several versions of the Song are known. In all versions, a man named Dorang-seonbi marries a woman named Cheongjeong-gaksi, only to die almost immediately after the wedding. Distraught, Cheongjeong-gaksi weeps or prays until a Buddhist priest—or a god in the form of one—gives her a set of tasks by which she can meet her husband again. The most recurrent tasks are tearing out her hair and weaving the hair into a rope, boring holes into her palms and threading the rope into the holes, and either hanging on it, going back and forth on it, or both; repeatedly drenching her fingers in oil, then setting them on fire; and, finally, paving a difficult mountain road with only what remains of her bare hands. Having done all this, Cheongjeong-gaksi is briefly reunited with her husband before he dies or departs again. In the majority of versions, the woman ultimately commits suicide or otherwise dies to be reunited with her husband for good in the afterlife.

Dorang-seonbi and Cheongjeong-gaksi were worshipped in the Mangmuk-gut as eminent gods who paved the road on which the deceased soul would travel to the afterlife. In the funeral context, the Song demonstrated the unbreachable gap between the living and the dead but also suggested that shamanic ritual could lead to a brief reunion with the dead. Scholars have focused on the myth's Buddhist influences, and especially on its relationships to Neo-Confucian patriarchy. Whether Cheongjeong-gaksi is motivated by a patriarchal ideal of female virtue that the Song therefore supports, or whether she acts out of personal love, remains debated.

== Names ==
The central figures of the myth are the dead husband Dorang-seonbi and his grieving wife Cheongjeong-gaksi. Seonbi and gaksi are both titles, not integral parts of the names. Seonbi is a Korean word referring to a Confucian scholar, and gaksi simply means "newlywed bride." According to some versions of the narrative, the husband was named "Dorang" after the Korean word dol "stone", because it was hoped that he would live a long life just as a stone does not decay or perish. On the other hand, the name of the ritual in which the narrative was recited, dorang-chugwon (lit. 'dorang prayer'), is found in other areas of Korea where the myth of Dorang-seonbae is unknown. It may be that the mythological figure is named after the ritual, rather than vice versa. No version gives any indication of the meaning of "Cheongjeong".

Two of the versions (the 1966 and Gazette versions) name the heroine "Cheongcheon" instead of "Cheongjeong." The Gazette version also names her husband "Doryang," not "Dorang." For the sake of consistency, the article will always refer to Dorang-seonbi and Cheongjeong-gaksi.

== Narratives ==
Korean shamanic narratives are works of narrative oral literature sung during gut—the Korean term for large-scale rituals officiated by shamans—which constitute the mythology of Korean shamanism, the indigenous polytheistic religion of the country. As no standardized form of Korean shamanism or its mythology exists, shamanic narratives exist in multiple versions. There is also significant regional variation in the tradition, with many myths only recited in one specific region. The Song of Dorang-seonbi and Cheongjeong-gaksi is one such localized narrative, being unattested outside South Hamgyong Province, now North Korea.

Several versions of the narrative are currently known. All versions recorded after the division of Korea in the late 1940s are from shamans who had fled the North Korean government, or people who had learned from those shamans. Gut rituals are illegal and no longer held in North Korea, so the oral transmission of the narrative is presumed extinct. The ritual was thought to be virtually extinct in South Korea as well, as most refugee shamans did not pass down their knowledge. But in the 2010s, researchers were able to contact a community descended from North Korean refugees, living near the city of Sokcho in South Korea, who continue to recite the narrative today.

Reciting shaman	Shaman hometown	Date of recitation	Notes
Kim Geun-seong	Hongwon	1926	As Kim Geun-seong was extremely drunk when he was being interviewed by the researcher, a proper transcription was not possible. Despite this, the 1926 version remains among the longest and most detailed.
Ji Geum-seom	Hongwon	1965	Preserved only as a recording for five decades; first transcribed in 2019.
Yi Go-bun	Hamhung	1966	Transcribed, but the ending appears to be incomplete.
Jang Chae-sun	Unknown	1981	Only a summary of the plot exists in written form, but the recitation was filmed and is available on YouTube.
Unknown	Pukchong	Unknown	A summary is provided in the Pukchong County Gazette, a 1970 publication by refugees from Pukchong who had fled to South Korea during the division and the ensuing Korean War.
Yi Chan-yeop	Sokcho	2019	Yi Chan-yeop was born in 1982 but received training from refugee shamans from Hamgyong, notably his grandmother from Hamhung. Only a summary, first published in 2020, currently exists.

=== 1926 version ===
Cheongjeong-gaksi, the daughter of two gods, is arranged to be married to a young nobleman named Dorang-seonbi. The groom falls very ill the moment he enters the bride's gate for the wedding. They consult a shaman, who tells them that the sickness is because Dorang-seonbi's marriage gifts to Cheongjeong-gaksi were ritually impure. They burn the gifts, but he continues to be nearly comatose. He leaves alone on the wedding night, after telling his wife that he will have died if she sees a man with shorn hair at noon the next day. No such man comes at noon, but a shorn-haired servant of Dorang-seonbi arrives at her house at night (Note: 해시/亥時 haesi, nine to eleven P.M.) and announces that his master has died.

Cheongjeong-gaksi does nothing but weep day and night. The sound of weeping reaches the hall of the Jade Emperor, who orders a subordinate god, the Sage of the Golden Temple, to find the reason why. The god approaches her in the form of a Buddhist priest, and she pleads him to teach her how to meet her husband again. The priest tells her to fill a gourd container with clean water, then to go to Dorang-seonbi's grave alone and pray with it for three days. Cheongjeong-gaksi does so and is reunited with her husband. Delighted, she tries to grab his hand, but he disappears. The priest then tells her that what to do to be reunited with her husband another time:

"Tear out your hair, one by one. Weave them into a rope with three thousand strands and three thousand knots. Go to Geumsang Temple in Mount Annae and hang one end [of the rope] in the temple sanctum and hang the other end in the middle of the air. Bore holes into your two palms and insert the rope into your palms. If you do not say that you are in pain, even while three thousand girls are raising and lowering that rope with all their force, you will meet him."

Cheongjeong-gaksi does this, and Dorang-seonbi returns. When she attempts to embrace him, he disappears. The priest then tells her to dip her fingers in oil and let them dry, and to repeat this until she has dried fifteen mal (approximately 240 liters) of oil. Then she must set her fingers on fire while praying to the Buddha. When she does this, Dorang-seonbi returns to the living world, only to vanish once more when Cheongjeong-gaksi tries to embrace him. Finally, the priest tells her to pave the road from her home to Mount Annae using only what remains of her bare hands. While doing this, she discovers Dorang-seonbi paving the same road from the other direction. She embraces him, and he does not disappear.

On their way home, a sudden north wind knocks Dorang-seonbi off a bridge and hurls him into the river below. As he drowns, he tells his wife to commit suicide so they can reunite in the afterlife. Cheongjeong-gaksi goes home, "rejoicing greatly" at finally having understood how to be with Dorang-seonbi forever. She hangs herself. She finds her husband teaching painting to children in the afterlife. The two reunite and enjoy "infinite happiness." Later, they are reborn into the human world as deities invoked in the Mangmuk-gut.

=== 1965 version ===
Two divinities are banished from the realm of the gods and exiled into the human world. They marry and give birth to a boy, who they name "Dorang" after "stone" (dol). Dorang's mother dies when he is three and his father dies when he is four, and he is brought up by his maternal uncle. When the boy reaches fifteen, a marriage is arranged between him and Cheongjeong-gaksi. His uncle divines the future of the couple and determines that they are incompatible, but Dorang-seonbi insists on the marriage. He ignores a series of inauspicious omens on the way to his bride's house and falls ill on the night of the marriage. He leaves for home, telling Cheongjeong-gaksi that he will have died if she spits on the wall the next day and it immediately dries. Her spit dries the next morning, and a messenger soon arrives bearing the news of her husband's death.

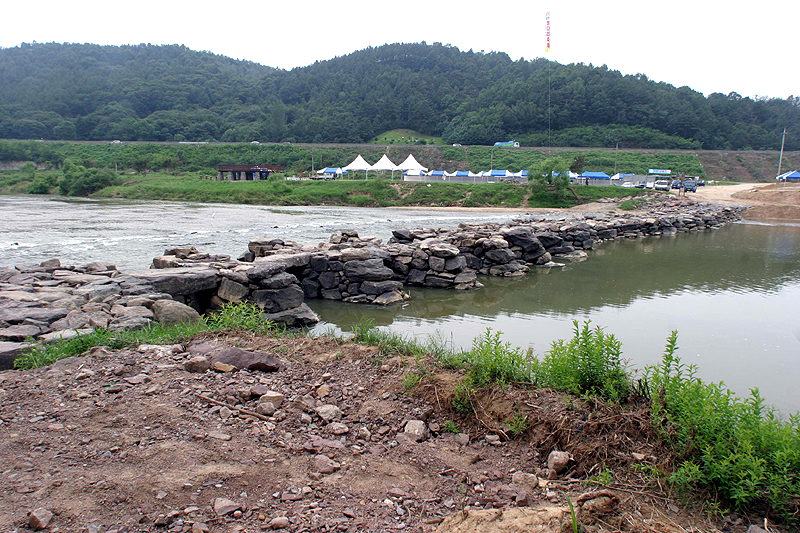
Traditional Korean bridge

The distraught Cheongjeong-gaksi refuses to eat or drink for a hundred days. The sound of her wailing reaches the celestial Geumsang Temple of Mount Anhe. The Sage of the Temple visits to tell her to fill a gourd dipper with rice in order to see her dead husband. When she pours the rice into the dipper, every grain vanishes. Next, the Sage tells her to dig a pit with her bare hands in the coldest winter; she must enter the pit wearing the panties she had worn on her night with Dorang-seonbi, then undress and put her panties in the pit. Though she does this, the Sage refuses to show her her husband until she brings him a being or an object called a jorangmalttadari, which is "the sort of thing that gathers rock and makes it split, and gathers water and makes it split."

When the woman brings him the jorangmalttadari, the Sage gives her the task—already seen in the 1926 version—of smearing and drying fifteen mal of oil and setting her fingers on fire. She manages this and finally sees Dorang-seonbi at a distance, although he soon disappears. Her next task is to be raised and lowered by a rope woven from her hair and running through her palms, with the same specifications as in the 1926 version. Even when she accomplishes this, Dorang-seonbi fails to appear.

The Sage finally orders Cheongjeong-gaksi to pave mountain roads with what remains of her hands. She falls asleep after weeping while paving the roads and finds Dorang-seonbi beside her when she awakes. But on the way home, a bridge spanning a river collapses while her husband is crossing it. Cheongjeong-gaksi returns to the Sage, who tells her to throw herself into the river where Dorang-seonbi drowned. She does this and is reunited with her husband in a world full of light. They later become gods.

=== 1966 version ===
Dorang-seonbi loses his parents at an early age and is brought up by his maternal uncle. The uncle chooses an inauspicious day for his nephew's marriage with Cheongjeong-gaksi, ignoring warnings from gods and birds. Dorang-seonbi falls sick on the wedding day. He spends one night in his bride's house and goes home, saying that white doves and white crows will bring news of him. Dorang-seonbi dies immediately upon coming home, and the birds deliver his wife a letter bearing the news.

Cheongjeong-gaksi continuously prays to see her husband again. One day, a Buddhist priest descends from heaven and says that she will meet him if she presses three mal and three doe (approximately sixty liters) of oil from bamboo seeds, dries them all by dipping them on her fingers, and then sets her fingers on fire. When she does this, she only briefly sees Dorang-seonbi flying on a horse. A shamanic god then appears to tell her to pave a high mountain road with ninety-nine curves, using only her bare hands. As she does this, she encounters her husband. But he departs after informing her that she cannot see him until after she dies. This ending appears incomplete.

=== 1981 version ===
Dorang-seonbi—named after dol "stone"—is raised by his uncle after his parents' early deaths. A marriage is arranged between him and Cheongjeong-gaksi. There are many ill omens on the way to the bride's house on the wedding day so that Dorang-seonbi wants to delay the marriage, but his uncle insists on having it on that day. The groom swiftly falls ill and is comatose by the end of the wedding ceremonies. He is taken home. When Cheongjeong-gaksi comes to visit her new husband, she finds him already dead.

Cheongjeong-gaksi weeps, hoping to see her husband again. She is visited by a Buddhist priest, who advises her to be submerged naked in icy water for five midwinter days. At the end of her torment, she is allowed to briefly meet Dorang-seonbi. The priest then tells her to immerse her fingers in a pot of oil for three years, then to set them on fire while praying to the Buddha. She does this and is once more briefly reunited with her husband.

Next, the priest tells her to tear out all her hair and entwine them into a string three thousand feet long, and to tie one end of it to a pine tree on top of Mount Nam and the other end to a pillar in Geumsang Temple. She must then thread the hair-string into holes in her palms and go back and forth on the string three thousand times. When the string snaps, she sees Dorang-seonbi washing his face. She runs there and finds nothing but water. Finally, the priest tells her to pave the harsh roads to Geumsang Temple with her bare hands. At last, she is reunited with her husband, but he falls off a bridge and drowns on the way. When Cheongjeong-gaksi digs a pit near Dorang-seonbi's grave and weeps inside it, her husband returns.

=== Gazette version ===
Dorang-seonbi and Cheongjeong-gaksi are young neighbors, presumably lovers, who receive their parents' permission to marry. They select an auspicious day for the wedding, but Dorang-seonbi suddenly falls ill and dies on his wife's lap on the night of the marriage. Devastated, Cheongjeong-gaksi does nothing but pray to the Buddha for three years.

After three years, an old Buddhist priest tells her to tear out all her hair and weave the strands into a rope, to thread it into holes bored into her palms, to span the rope over the Ch'ongch'on River, and to cross the River hundreds of times every day until the rope snaps and she meets her husband again. Gladly heeding the priest's suggestion, Cheongjeong-gaksi crosses the river back-and-forth for many decades. On the day the rope snaps, she sees Dorang-seonbi washing his face on the river's other side. She calls, but he does not answer. When she crosses the river, he is nowhere to be seen.

Once more, she prays to the Buddha for three years. The priest returns and tells her to submerge her hands in a jar of oil for three years, and then to keep them burning for another three years while praying to the Buddha. At the end of these six years, Dorang-seonbi appears and tells her to follow him. He leads her on the treacherous road to the afterlife, and they are reunited for good in the realm of the dead.

=== 2019 version ===
After long anticipating their marriage, Dorang-seonbi and Cheongjeong-gaksi are finally married at the age of eighteen and fifteen respectively. But when Cheongjeong-gaksi offers wine to her husband during the wedding, the wine turns into water, oil, and blood. Dorang-seonbi falls ill, goes home without spending the night, and dies in three days.

As in the 1926 version, her weeping reaches the Jade Emperor, who dispatches the Sage of the Golden Temple. Cheongjeong-gaksi's first task is to go to Geumsang Temple and recite ten thousand nianfo (ritual praises of the Buddha) without moving her hands or feet. When Dorang-seonbi arrives just before the final nianfo, she tries to grab him and fails the task. Her next ordeal is to dip and dry thirty-five mal of oil on her fingers, then to set the fingers on fire and smell her flesh burn. When Dorang-seonbi arrives as she lights her hand, she tries to grab him, accidentally extinguishing the fire.

The Sage then orders Cheongjeong-gaksi to tear out her hair and thread it into the palms in her hand. This version then combines the two variations seen in the earlier versions. Once she has strung the rope into her palms, she must first go back and forth on it three thousand times, then be spun about on the rope another three thousand times. Dorang-seonbi arrives on the penultimate spin, and she tries to grab him. The rope snaps and she fails. The Sage then tells her to pave mountain roads with her bare hands. Dorang-seonbi arrives as she is about to place the final stone. When she tries to grab him first, a wind blows him away. As he vanishes, Dorang-seonbi tells her to commit suicide. She hangs herself and rejoins him in the afterlife. They both become gods.

=== Comparison chart ===
Comparison chart of Cheongjeong-gaksi's tasks
1926	1965	1966	1981	Gazette	2019
Praying at her husband's grave for three days				Praying to the Buddha for three years	Reciting ten thousand nianfo without moving her hands and feet
	Filling a gourd dipper with rice				
	Digging a pit with her bare hands in midwinter and undressing in it		Being submerged in icy water naked for five midwinter days		
	Bringing an object called a jorangmalttadari				
Tearing out her hair and weaving it into a rope, then threading the rope into her palms	Dipping her hands or fingers in oil, then setting them on fire		Dipping her hands or fingers in oil, then setting them on fire	Tearing out her hair and weaving it into a rope, then threading the rope into her palms	Dipping her hands or fingers in oil, then setting them on fire
Dipping her hands or fingers in oil, then setting them on fire	Tearing out her hair and weaving it into a rope, then threading the rope into her palms	Dipping her hands or fingers in oil, then setting them on fire	Tearing out her hair and weaving it into a rope, then threading the rope into her palms	Dipping her hands or fingers in oil, then setting them on fire	Tearing out her hair and weaving it into a rope, then threading the rope into her palms
Paving a difficult road with what remains of her bare hands				Following her husband on the dangerous road to the afterlife	Paving a difficult road with what remains of her bare hands

== Religious purpose and significance ==
The Song of Dorang-seonbi and Cheongjeong-gaksi is recited during the dorang-chugwon, the tenth rite of the Mangmuk-gut: the funeral ceremony of South Hamgyong shamanism. The Mangmuk-gut is divided into three processes: an initial series of rituals through which various deities are invited into the funeral grounds and feasted; the second, central process by which the soul of the deceased is severed from its bonds to the living and dispatched to the afterlife; and a final rite in which the invited deities are returned to the supernatural realm.

The dorang-chugwon is the single most important component of both the second process and of the entire funeral because it is believed to generate the road to the afterlife on which the deceased soul will journey. Dorang-seonbi and Cheongjeong-gaksi are worshipped as gods who create this road for the dead upon the shaman's recitation of their Song. Accordingly, out of the eight shamanic narratives recited during the funeral, the Song is both the most ritually important and the most popular among the worshippers. Its two central figures are the most venerated among all of the invoked gods and were even worshipped as second to the Buddha in Buddhist temples in South Hamgyong.

In the context of the funeral, an important purpose of the narrative is to demonstrate the unbreachable gap between the living and the dead. In all versions of the myth, Cheongjeong-gaksi undergoes excruciating torment. Yet no matter her pain, she cannot be reunited with her husband so long as she is alive and he is dead. This divide is referenced explicitly by her husband's soul in many versions, as in the conclusion of the 1966 transcript:

"Oh, it's still far away. You were born in this world too, and you'll ascend among the immortals. So you'll meet me when you're dead, and not when you're alive."

Thus Cheongjeong-gaksi is obliged to commit suicide or otherwise die. (Note: Her entry into the pit in the 1966 version is symbolic of death.) As the shaman recites the sacred narrative, the bereaved at the funeral come to accept that their loved one is gone to a place where no living person can possibly reach them, just as Cheongjeong-gaksi could not resurrect her husband even at the end of such pain. As folklorist Shin Yeon-woo states, the heroine's ultimate death shows that "human hopes cannot prevail over the order of the world, though the narrative shows how ardent and desperate those hopes may be."

Despite the emphasis on the separation between the living and the dead, Dorang-seonbi and Cheongjeong-gaksi are invoked as divine linkers between the two, and scholars have also emphasized connective motifs in the myth. Kim Sun-hyun points out that the story demonstrates the interlinkedness of life and death from its very beginning; death strikes at a lavish wedding, the beginning of a new life. The most important of Cheongjeong-gaksi's tasks may also be seen as connective. The rope that she weaves from her hair is hung between two different places; in versions where one end is hung in the middle of the air, it implicitly links the temple sanctum to the supernatural realm. In the 1926 version, the fire too is explicitly said to be bright enough to be seen in the afterlife and to thereby draw Dorang-seonbi back to the living world. Kim also notes that the narrative centers on liminal spaces such as gates, graves, mountain temples, and bridges, furthering its ritual purpose of connection.

Cheongjeong-gaksi paving the road with her bare hands, which appears in all but one of the versions, is a particularly important connective element. Cheongjeong-gaksi's road is symbolic of the road to the afterlife that the dead soul will travel on through the Mangmuk-gut. Unlike the other tasks, the paved road leads to a genuine reunion, albeit a very brief one before the husband returns to the afterlife. This parallels the nature of the funeral itself, in which the bereaved are able to briefly reunite with their loved ones and bid them farewell before they enter the unreachable world of the dead. The myth, therefore, affirms both the unfordable gap between life and death and the ability of religious ritual to allow brief communion between the two.

Folklorist Shin Donghun argues that over the course of the recitation, Cheongjeong-gaksi acts as a surrogate for the bereaved. Her physical agony stands for the emotional agony felt upon a loved one's death. By committing suicide, she acts out the unrealizable desire of the bereaved to kill themselves and join the deceased in the afterlife. As they listen to the narrative, the people at the funeral are able to metaphorically "become Cheongjeong-gaksi, hang themselves, and head to the afterlife to meet their loved one." Among the final episodes of the narrative, in which Cheongjeong-gaksi finds Dorang-seonbi doing well in the afterlife, presents hope to the funeral attendees that the deceased person of this particular funeral is at peace there as well. Shin concludes that the religious purpose of the narrative is to help overcome the emotional pain of death.

== Theories and interpretations ==
=== Relationship to Buddhism ===
The Song of Dorang-seonbi and Cheongjeong-gaksi has received scholarly attention for its vividly gory descriptions, which are unusual in Korean shamanic narratives. It is generally accepted that Cheongjeong-gaksi's ordeals reflect Buddhist influence.

The Samguk yusa, a thirteenth-century compilation of Korean legends by the Buddhist priest Iryeon, includes two apparently related stories. In one of the legends, a man threads a rope into holes that he has bored into his palms, hangs the rope on two stakes, and shakes his hands to-and-fro while making a mudra (a Buddhist hand gesture), thereby reaching the Pure Land. In another legend, a nangdo named Deugogok encounters a Buddhist priest paving a road. When the priest appears in his dreams that night, Deugogok inquires of the priest and learns that he has died.

Cheongjeong-gaksi burning her fingers, her most recurrent ordeal, has been connected to the Buddhist devotional practice of self-immolation. In particular, the Lotus Sutra describes the bodhisattva Bhaishajyaraja smearing himself in scented oil and setting himself on fire. The Buddha praises his sacrifice and says that one who seeks Anuttarā-samyak-saṃbodhi (the highest level of Buddhist enlightenment) should be willing to set a finger on fire.

=== Relationship to patriarchy ===
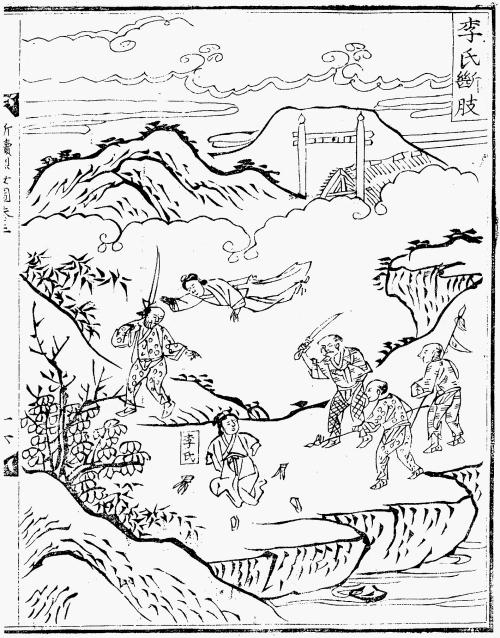
A "virtuous woman" chooses to lose her hands and feet rather than lose her chastity. 1619 illustration.

Much of the academic research on the Song of Dorang-seonbi and Cheongjeong-gaksi has focused on its relationship to patriarchal social structures. The long-ruling Joseon dynasty (1392–1910) of Korea sought to mold Korean family structures along Neo-Confucian patriarchal values, and a key part of this effort was the promotion of the social ideal of the "virtuous woman" (열녀/烈女, yeolnyeo): a wife totally devoted to her husband. Moralistic tracts published by the Joseon government include hundreds of stories of such "virtuous women," including dozens of young women who committed suicide when their husbands died and one tale of a young widow who cut off her hair, ears, and nose to protest her family's suggestions that she remarry.

In an important article in 2001, folklorist Cho Hyun-soul first argued that the Song promoted this social ideology among the worshippers, writing:

The cultural arbitrary inculcated by Cheongjeong-gaksi and Dorang-seonbae is this rule: that a wife must endure every possible hardship for her husband's sake, and that she is a being whose the earthly duty is to restore her family... Through this symbolic violence, the educational acts on the shamanic ritual ground legitimize the arbitrary; by legitimizing it, they reproduce the preexisting power relations. And they conceal the dominant order, that is, the male-dominant order. Male power is thereby overlaid with the symbolic power reserved to it.

Cho argued that the agony of Cheongjeong-gaksi represents the suffering of women under a system that marginalized them and that the fact that Cheongjeong-gaksi readily accepts that agony and is ultimately rewarded with divinity reflects women's acceptance and internalization of the patriarchal order. Cho's thesis has been accepted by many scholars. For instance, the folklorist Han Yang-ha notes that since Cheongjeong-gaksi is barred from women's social identities of a wife and a mother, her only way to gain recognition is as a self-sacrificial "virtuous woman."

However, scholars such as Han also noted that Cheongjeong-gaksi shows desires and sexual lust as well, as in her repeated attempts to make physical contact with her husband. Han argued that the heroine's suffering reflected the common perception in patriarchal Korean society that female desire was sinful. Since the late 2010s, other scholars have questioned whether the Song is fundamentally supportive of patriarchy. Yoon Joon-seop points out that although many "virtuous women" commit suicide, none of them are reunited with their husbands, whereas Cheongjeong-gaksi always is. He argues that the difference is that "virtuous women" were motivated by the patriarchal notion of female virtue, while Cheongjeong-gaksi is driven by genuine personal love. He supports the argument with the Gazette version, previously unknown to academia, in which the husband and wife are depicted as lovers even before the marriage. Yoon also notes the fact that Dorang-seonbi is responsible for his own death in most versions and that it is the woman who actively brings about their reunion, which may imply an overcoming of the patriarchal order.

Dorang-seonbi is brought up by his maternal uncle, and some versions portray the uncle as being responsible for his nephew's death. In the 1966 version, this becomes an etiological story that explains why maternal uncles are now banned from being involved in marriage arrangements in South Hamgyong culture. This motif is understood as a reflection of the historical shift of Koreans from matrilocal to patrilocal residence, caused by the Joseon enforcement of Confucian family structures.

== See also ==
- Life replacement narratives, a group of Korean shamanic narratives, one of which is also sung in funerals
