= Gosure =

Korean ritual action

- Hangul: 고수레
- RR: gosure
- MR: kosure

Gosure (Korean: 고수레) is a form of ritual action from Korean folk religion, in which food is thrown into the air after shouting "Gosure" (pronounced "go-su-REH"). This ritual stems from the belief that people will get ill if the ritual is not performed.

== Folktale ==
The folk tale associated with this ritual comes from various regions in Korea. There is a story about a poor man with the family name of "Go" who survived with help from the people from the village. After he died with no descendants, people threw food in the air as an offering to his spirit, after shouting "Go See ne!", which means "to misses Go" in the Korean language. Various versions of this folk tale exist with different protagonists, such as a boatman, a woman surnamed Go who was the mother of a Buddhist monk, or a man who dies after doing charity.
