= Korean mythology =

Myths of ancient Korea

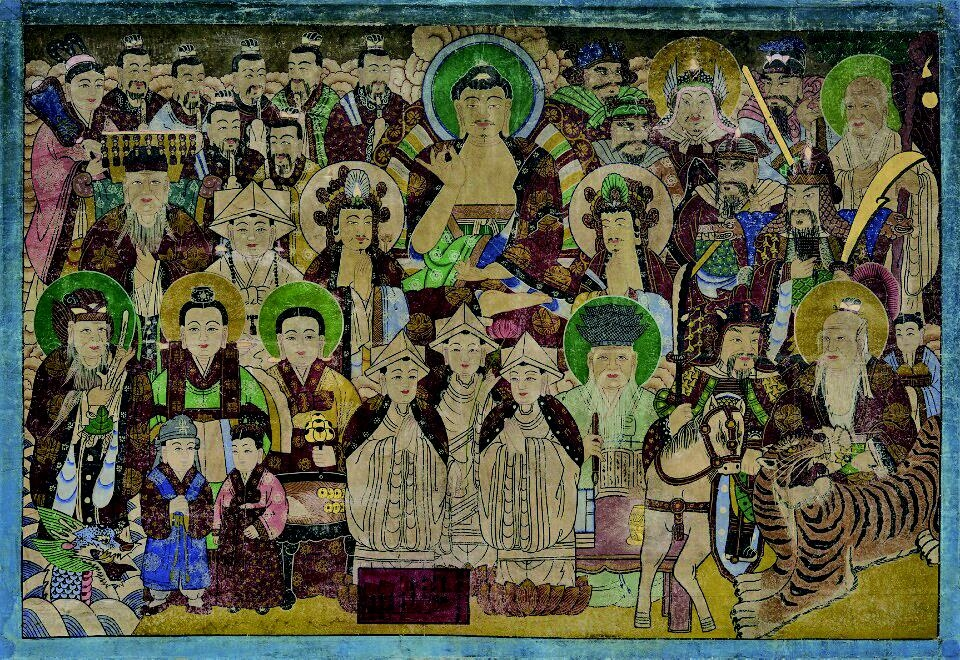
- Early 19th-century painting depicting thirty-two shamanic deities. The three young gods in white wearing conical caps (bottom center) are the Jeseok triplets, gods of fertility that appear in the Jeseok bon-puri, the most widespread Korean myth.

Korean name
- Hangul: 한국 신화
- Hanja: 韓國神話
- RR: Hanguk sinhwa
- MR: Han'guk sinhwa

Korean mythology (Korean: 한국 신화; Hanja: 韓國神話) is the group of myths (Note: The term myth is used here in its academic sense, meaning "a traditional story consisting of events that are ostensibly historical, though often supernatural, explaining the origins of a cultural practice or natural phenomenon". It is not being used to mean "something that is false".) told by historical and modern Koreans. There are two types: the written, literary mythology in traditional histories, mostly about the founding monarchs of various historical kingdoms, and the much larger and more diverse oral mythology, mostly narratives sung by shamans or priestesses (mansin) in rituals invoking the gods and which are still considered sacred today.

The historicized state-foundation myths representing the bulk of the literary mythology are preserved in Hanja literary works such as Samguk sagi and Samguk yusa. One state's foundation myth, that of the first Korean kingdom of Gojoseon by legendary king Dangun, has become the founding myth of the whole Korean nation. State-foundation myths are further divided into northern, such as that of the kingdom of Goguryeo and its founder Jumong, where the founder is the son of a celestial male figure and an earthly female figure, and southern, such as that of the kingdom of Silla and its founder Hyeokgeose, where the founder begins as an object descended from the heavens, and himself marries an earthly woman. Other literary myths include the origin myths of family lineages recorded in genealogies.

The narratives of Korean shamanism, the country's indigenous religion, feature a diverse array of both gods and humans. They are recited in ritual contexts both to please the gods and to entertain the human worshippers. As oral literature, the shamanic narrative is regularly revised with each performance, although a certain degree of consistency is required; new narratives have appeared since the 1960s. It has frequently been at odds with the official ideologies of Korean society, and its mythology is often characterized as subversive of traditional norms such as patriarchy.

The shamanic mythology is divided into five regional traditions, with each region having original narratives, as well as distinctive versions of pan-Korean narratives. The mythological tradition of southern Jeju Island is especially divergent. The two narratives found in all but one region respectively are the Jeseok bon-puri, featuring a girl who in most versions is impregnated by a supernaturally potent Buddhist priest—who was probably originally a sky god—and gives birth to triplets who themselves become gods; and the Princess Bari, about a princess who is abandoned by her father for being a girl and who later resurrects her dead parents with the flower of life.

== Introduction ==
Korean mythology comprises two distinct corpora of literature. The first is the literary mythology (문헌신화; 文獻神話, munheon sinhwa) recorded in the traditional Korean histories, such as the thirteenth-century work Samguk yusa. The myths contained in these volumes are heavily historicized, to the point that it is often difficult to differentiate between historical fact and mythology. The primary literary myths are the state-foundation myths (건국신화; 建國神話, geon'guk sinhwa), which recount the story of how a particular kingdom or dynasty was founded, although the category also includes other supernatural stories found in the historical chronicles as well as the origin myths of non-royal lineages.

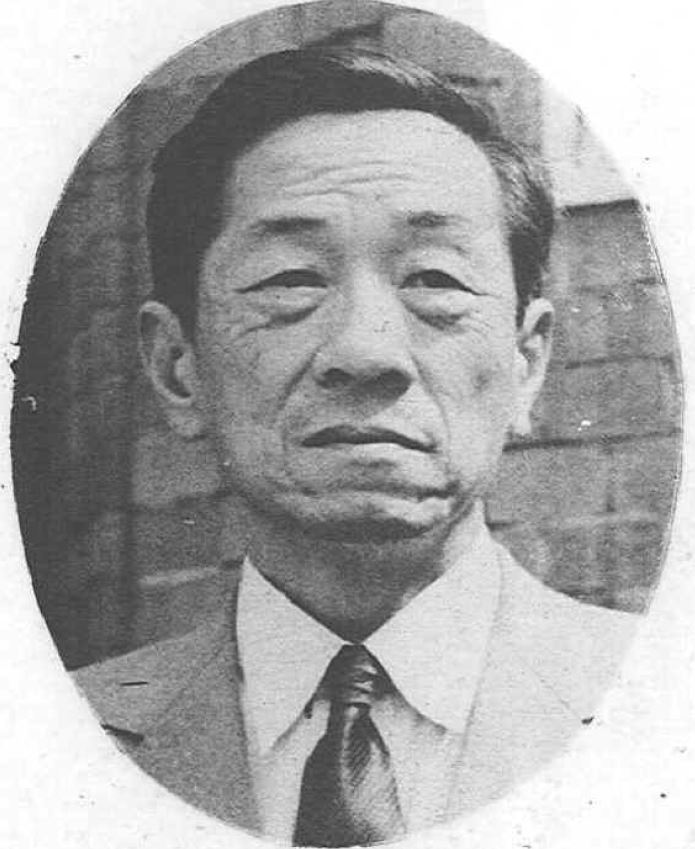
Historian Yi Pyong-do in 1955

The second corpus is the modern oral mythology (구비신화; 口碑神話, gubi sinhwa), which is "incomparably" richer than the literary tradition in both sheer quantity of material and the diversity of themes and content. The oral mythology primarily consists of the shamanic narratives (서사무가; 徐事巫歌, seosa muga), which are sung by Korean shamans during gut, religious ceremonies in which shamans invoke the gods. While also mythological in content, these narratives are very different in function and content from the literary myths. The state-foundation myths are preserved only in writing, deprived of their original ritual context, and have existed in written form for centuries. By contrast, the shamanic narratives are oral literature that is "living mythology," sacred religious truth to the participants of the gut. They began to be published only in 1930, centuries after the first attestation of the literary myths. Unlike the historicized accounts of the literary myths, shamans's songs feature elements such as the primordial history of the world, the ascent of human individuals to divinity, and divine retribution upon impious mortals.

The academic study of Korean mythology began with the literary myths, with historians such as Choe Nam-seon (1890–1957) and Yi Pyong-do (1896–1989) pioneering the first studies of state-foundation myths. But research into the much richer oral corpus was minimal until the 1960s, when the study of the shamanic narratives was spearheaded by scholars such as Kim Yeol-gyu (1932–2013), who applied structuralist, comparative, and myth-ritual approaches to the songs, Hyeon Yong-jun (1931–2016), who published a vast encyclopedia of Jeju ritual and mythology, and Seo Daeseok (born 1942), who established the literary study of the shamanic narratives and whose comprehensive work on the Jeseok bon-puri narrative proved a model for future researchers. Recent trends in the study of Korean mythology since the 1990s include a greater focus on comparisons with neighboring mythologies, new research into the hitherto neglected village-shrine myths (당신화; 堂神話, dang sinhwa) that involve the patron god of one specific village, and feminist interpretations. Bella Myong-wol Dalton-Fenkl and renowned folklorist Heinz Insu Fenkl wrote Korean Myths, published by Thames and Hudson in 2024, that provides a comprehensive introduction to Korean Mythology.

The oral mythology is always religious, and must be distinguished from the broader corpus of Korean folklore, which might be secular. For instance, the Woncheon'gang bon-puri, a Jeju shamanic narrative about a girl who goes in search for her parents and becomes a goddess, is either descended from or ancestral to a very similar mainland Korean folktale called the Fortune Quest. But because the Woncheon'gang bon-puri is a sacred story about a goddess, unlike the Fortune Quest, the former is a myth and the latter is not. Some Korean myths are mythicized folktales, while many Korean folktales are desacralized myths.

== Literary mythology ==
=== State-foundation myths ===
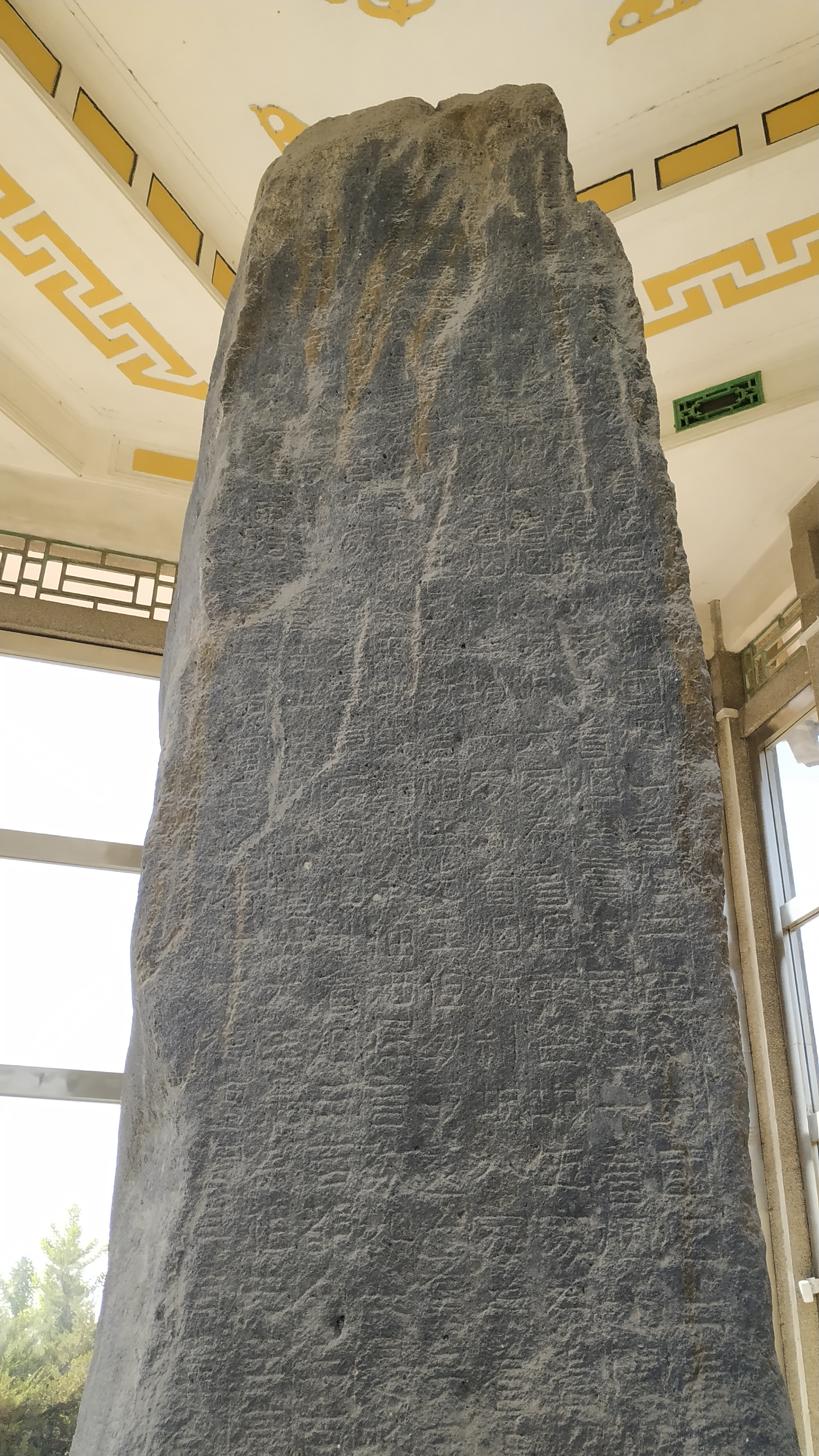
Gwanggaeto Stele

State-foundation myths narrate the life of the first ruler of a new Korean kingdom or dynasty. They include the founder's supernatural birth, the story of how the founder came to create his kingdom, and his miraculous death or departure. They are often interpreted as euhemerized accounts of actual events that happened during the kingdom's founding.

The oldest surviving accounts of the founding myths of the ancient Korean kingdoms—such as Gojoseon, Goguryeo, and Silla—are transcribed in Classical Chinese in Korean texts compiled during or after the twelfth century. Such texts include Samguk sagi, Samguk yusa, Jewang ungi, Eungje siju, and Tongguk t'onggam. These texts were compiled on the basis of earlier sources that are now lost. Several ancient Chinese texts are also important contemporaneous sources for myths; these include not only the official dynastic histories such as the third-century Records of the Three Kingdoms and the sixth-century Book of Wei, but also more general texts such as the Lunheng, written in 80 CE. In the case of Goguryeo, there are also five Chinese-language stelae narrating the kingdom's foundation myth from the perspective of the Goguryeo people themselves. The oldest of the five is the Gwanggaeto Stele, erected in 414 CE.

The founding myth of the Goryeo dynasty, which ruled Korea from the tenth to the fourteenth centuries, is recorded in Goryeo-sa, the official dynastic history published in the fifteenth century. Yongbieocheon'ga, a poem published around the same time as Goryeo-sa by the succeeding Joseon dynasty, is sometimes seen as the Joseon foundation myth, but it is debated whether Yongbieocheon'ga should be seen as having a narrative at all. As the Joseon were the final Korean dynasty, there are no newer founding myths.

State foundation myths were once also narrated orally, perhaps by shamans. The poet Yi Gyu-bo (1168–1241) mentions that both written and spoken forms of the Goguryeo foundation myth were known during his lifetime, even though the kingdom itself had fallen more than five centuries earlier. The modern Jeseok bon-puri shamanic narrative has many structural parallels to the Goguryeo myth and may be a direct descendant of the ancient tale.

The ancient (pre-Goryeo) state-foundation myths are classified into two major types, northern and southern, though both share the central motif of a king associated with the heavens. (Note: Lee Ji-young posits three types, by making the appearance of sky god that fathers the founder monarch in the northern myths into a separate type in which the founder descends directly from heaven. She concedes that this third type is generally combined with the northern-type myths.) In the northern kingdoms of Gojoseon, Buyeo, and Goguryeo, the founding monarch is born from the coupling of a celestial male figure and an earthly woman. In the southern kingdoms of Silla and Geumgwan Gaya, the king is generated from a physical object that descends from heaven, and then marries an earthly woman himself. In the northern myths, the demigod king succeeds his heavenly father or creates a new kingdom himself. In the south, the celestial being is crowned by the consensus of local chieftains.

==== Northern kingdoms ====
===== Gojoseon =====
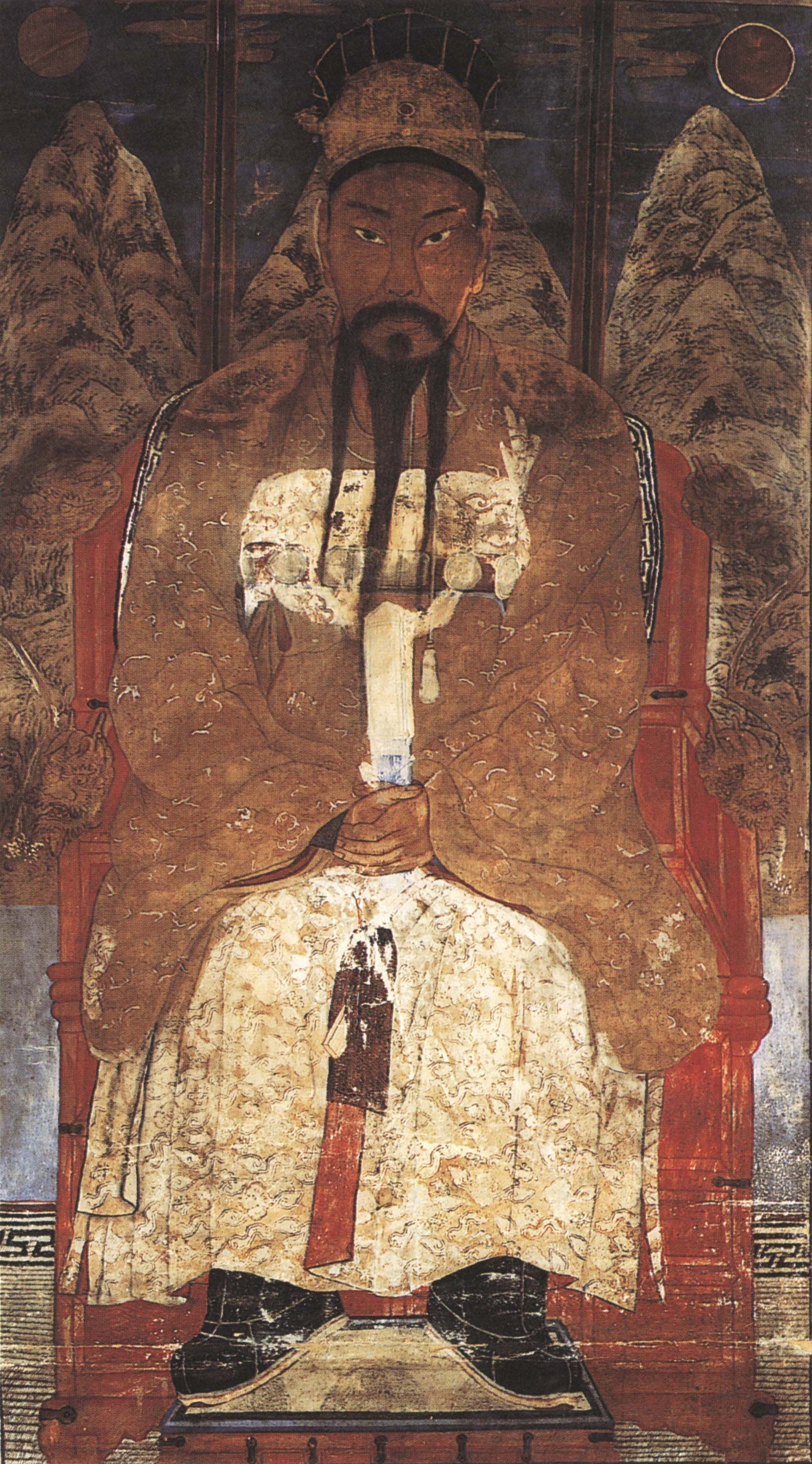
Early 20th century portrait of Dangun

The foundation myth of Gojoseon, the earliest Korean kingdom, is first recorded in two nearly contemporaneous works: Samguk yusa, a history compiled by the Buddhist monk Iryeon around the late 1270s, and Jewang ungi, a Chinese-language epic poem written in 1287.

Iryeon's account is as follows. Hwanung, a younger son of the sky god Hwanin (who the monk identifies with the Buddhist god Indra), desires to rule the human world. Hwanin sees that his son could "broadly benefit the human world," and gives him three unspecified treasures to take with him to earth. Hwanung descends beneath a sacred tree on Mount Taebaek (lit. 'great white mountain'), where he and his three thousand followers found the "Sacred City." With the gods of wind, rain, and cloud, Hwanin supervises various human affairs.

A bear and a tiger then ask that Hwanung turn them into humans. The god gives the animals twenty pieces of garlic and a clump of sacred mugwort, and tells them that they will become humans if they eat them and do not see sunlight for a hundred days. The two animals then fast, and the bear becomes a woman on the twenty-first day. The tiger fails to fast and remains an animal. The bear-turned-woman prays for a child at the sacred tree, and Hwanung grants her wish by becoming a human to marry her. She gives birth to a boy named Dangun Wanggeom, who founds the kingdom of Gojoseon at the site of Pyongyang. Dangun rules for fifteen centuries, then departs from the kingdom when the Chinese King Wu of Zhou sends Jizi to rule over Korea. The king ultimately becomes a mountain god.

The Dangun myth is of the northern type, featuring the founder's birth from a celestial father (Hwanung) and an earthly mother (the bear). It is often interpreted as a mythicized account of interactions between three clans whose totemic symbols or mythological ancestors were a sky god, a bear, and a tiger respectively. The tiger-associated clan was somehow eliminated, but the bear clan joined the dominant sky god clan in the establishment of the Gojoseon polity. Folklorist James H. Grayson draws connections to the Japanese foundation myth. Ninigi-no-Mikoto descends to earth with three treasures as well, and the first Japanese emperor Jinmu is a younger son like Hwanung. Grayson also notes Siberian myths where a bear is the mother of a tribal ancestor.

Dangun appears to have been worshipped only locally in the Pyongyang area until the thirteenth century, when intellectuals attempted to bolster the legitimacy of the Korean state, then imperiled by Mongol invasion and domination, by establishing him as the ancestor of all Korean polities. By the twentieth century he had become accepted as the mythical founder of the Korean nation and plays an important role in the ideologies of both North and South Korea.

===== Buyeo, Goguryeo, and Baekje =====
The foundation myth of the northern kingdom of Goguryeo is recorded in detail in both the Samguk sagi, the oldest surviving work of Korean history, compiled in 1145, and the Dongmyeongwang-pyeon, a Chinese-language epic poem written by the poet Yi Gyu-bo in 1193. Yi's work is much longer and more detailed than the Samguk sagi, but much of this may be due to the poet's own literary embellishment. The Dongmyeongwang-pyeon myth is summarized below.

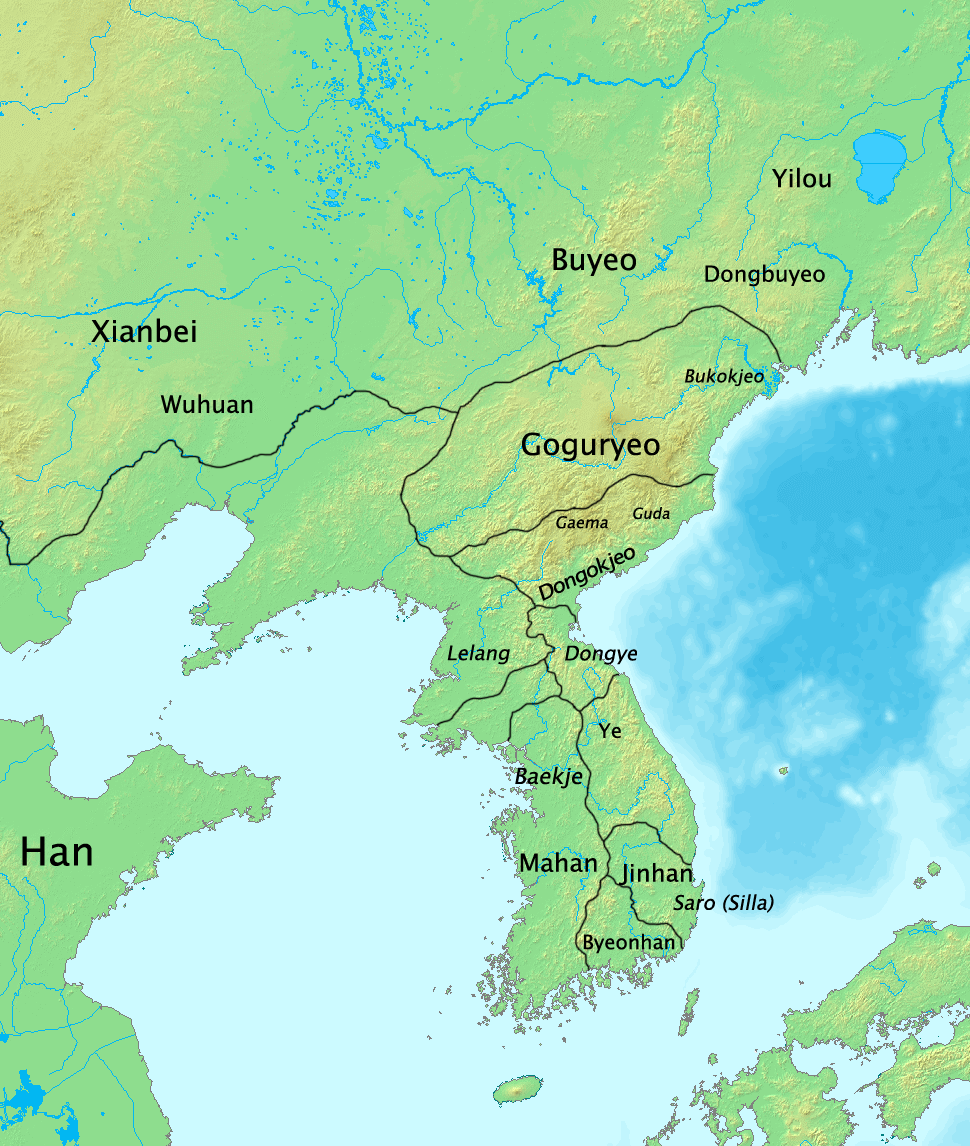
The Korean Peninsula in the early 1st century CE

Haeburu, ruler of the kingdom of Buyeo, is childless. One day, he finds a boy in the shape of a golden frog (Korean pronunciation of Classical Chinese: 金蛙 geumwa) and adopts him as his son. Some time later, Haeburu moves his court towards the Sea of Japan, where he founds the kingdom of Eastern Buyeo (Dong-Buyeo).

Haemosu, son of the sky god, descends to Haeburu's former capital in 59 BCE on a chariot steered by five dragons and founds a new kingdom there. One day, Haemosu encounters the three beautiful daughters of the god of the Yalu River and abducts Yuhwa, the oldest. The outraged river god challenges him to a shapeshifting duel but is bested. The river god concedes his defeat and allows Haemosu to marry Yuhwa, but after the marriage the former returns to the heavens without his wife.

The river god sends Yuhwa into exile. She is captured by a fisherman and brought to Geumwa the frog-king, who has succeeded his adopted father in Eastern Buyeo. He keeps her in an annex of the palace. One day, sunlight falls on Yuhwa from the heavens, impregnating her. She gives birth to an egg from her left armpit, and a boy hatches from the egg. The boy is supernaturally potent, including shooting down flies with a bow—for which he is named Jumong, "good archer." The king makes Jumong the stable-keeper, which offends him enough that he decides to found his own kingdom. With three companions, Jumong flees south, leaving his mother and wife behind. When they find an unfordable river, Jumong proclaims his divine descent, and the fish and turtles of the river allow them to cross on their backs. Jumong founds the kingdom of Goguryeo in 37 BCE. He is opposed by an established local chieftain named Songyang. After a series of confrontations between the two, Songyang ultimately surrenders when Jumong causes a great flood in his country.

Yuri, Jumong's son by his wife he has left behind in Eastern Buyeo, asks his mother who his father is. When she tells him that he does not have any one father, he attempts to kill himself, forcing her to reveal the truth. After solving a riddle his father has left, Yuri finds his father's token, a half of a sword. He goes to Goguryeo and meets Jumong. Yuri and Jumong match their halves of the sword, and the sword becomes one while oozing blood. When Jumong asks his son to show his power, the boy rides atop sunlight. Jumong then makes Yuri his heir. In 19 BCE, the king ascends into heaven and does not return. Yuri holds a funeral for his father, using the king's whip in place of his missing body, and becomes Goguryeo's second king.

The foundation of the southwestern kingdom of Baekje is also linked to the Jumong myth. According to the Samguk sagi, when Yuri is made heir, Jumong's two sons by a local wife are excluded from the kingship. These two brothers, Biryu and Onjo, migrate south to found their own kingdoms. Biryu sets up court in an unfavorable place, while Onjo founds Baekje in good terrain in what is now southern Seoul. The former dies of shame when he learns that his brother's kingdom is flourishing, and the remnants of his people join Baekje.

The myth of Jumong is of the northern type, with Haemosu as the celestial father and Yuhwa as the earthly woman. Contemporaneous Chinese sources report that Jumong and Yuhwa were both actively worshipped as gods by the Goguryeo people, including in rituals involving shamans. Like the Dangun myth, the story is also subject to euhemerized interpretations. For instance, Seo Daeseok argues that Haemosu symbolizes an ancient iron-using, agricultural sun-worshipping people, that Yuhwa was a member of a riverine group of hunters, farmers, and fishermen, and that Geumwa's polity centered on hunting and pastoralism.

The Jumong myth is first attested in the fifth-century Gwanggaeto Stele, but the first-century Chinese text Lunheng describes a barbarian tale of a good archer who crosses a river on the backs of fish and turtles to found a new kingdom in the south. However, this figure's mother is a slave-girl impregnated by an egg-like energy rather than a goddess who gives birth to a physical egg, and the figure himself founds the kingdom of Buyeo, rather than that of Goguryeo. The Goguryeo foundation myth thus incorporates the myths of Haemosu and Yuri and the Buyeo foundation myth into a single narrative.

==== Southern kingdoms ====
===== Silla =====
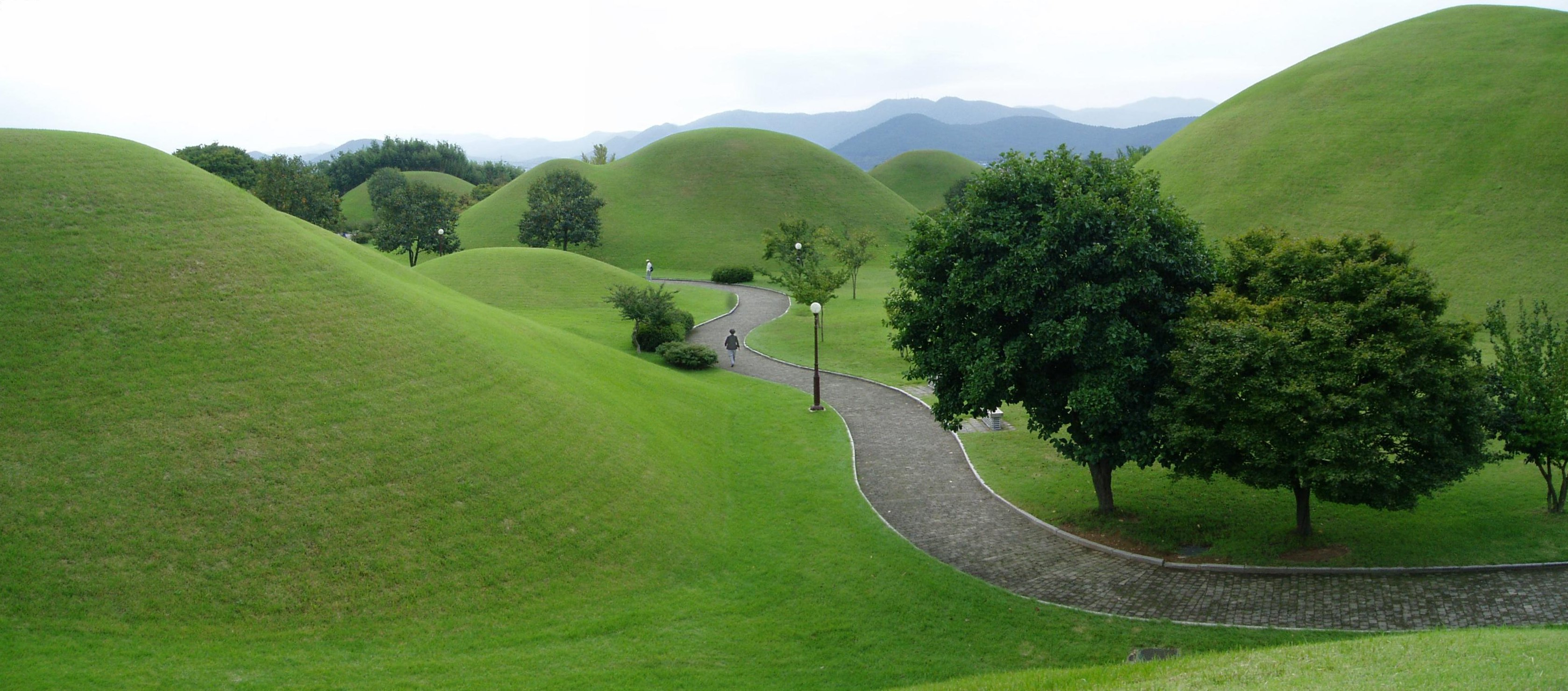
The Daereungwon tomb park in Gyeongju

The ancient Silla kingdom was originally dominated by three clans: the Bak, the Seok, and the Kim. At some point the Seok were eliminated from power, and all Silla monarchs from then on were children of a Kim father and a Bak mother. All three clans have associated founding myths.

The Bak foundation myth is given in the fullest detail in Samguk yusa. Six chieftains of the Gyeongju area convene to found a united kingdom. They see a strange light shining on a well. When they go there, they see a white horse kneeling. The horse ascends to heaven, leaving a large egg behind. The chieftains break open the egg and find a beautiful boy inside, who they name Hyeokgeose.

Some time later, a chicken-dragon gives birth to a beautiful girl with a chicken beak from its left rib. When they wash the girl in a nearby stream, the beak falls off. When the boy and the girl are both thirteen years old, the chieftains crown them as the first king and queen of Silla and give the king the clan name of Bak. Hyeokgeose rules for sixty-one years and ascends to heaven. Seven days later, his dead body drops from the sky. The queen dies soon after. A giant snake prevents the people from holding a funeral until they dismember the body into five parts, which is why Hyeokgeose has five different tombs.

The Samguk yusa also records the Seok and Kim foundation myths. In the first, a ship surrounded by magpies lands on the Silla coast after sailing away from Gaya for unspecified reasons. There is a giant chest in the ship, and when they open it they find slaves, treasures, and a young boy inside. The boy, Seok Talhae, reveals that he is a prince of a country called Yongseong (lit. 'dragon castle'). When he was born in the form of an egg, his father put him inside the chest and sent him away to found his own kingdom abroad. Having settled in Silla, Seok steals the house of the aristocrat Hogong through deceit and marries the eldest daughter of the Silla king, a descendant of Hyeokgeose. He succeeds his father-in-law as king and founds the Seok clan. After his death, he becomes the patron god of a local mountain. A village-shrine bon-puri very similar to the Seok Talhae myth is transmitted by modern shamans in the southern island of Jeju.

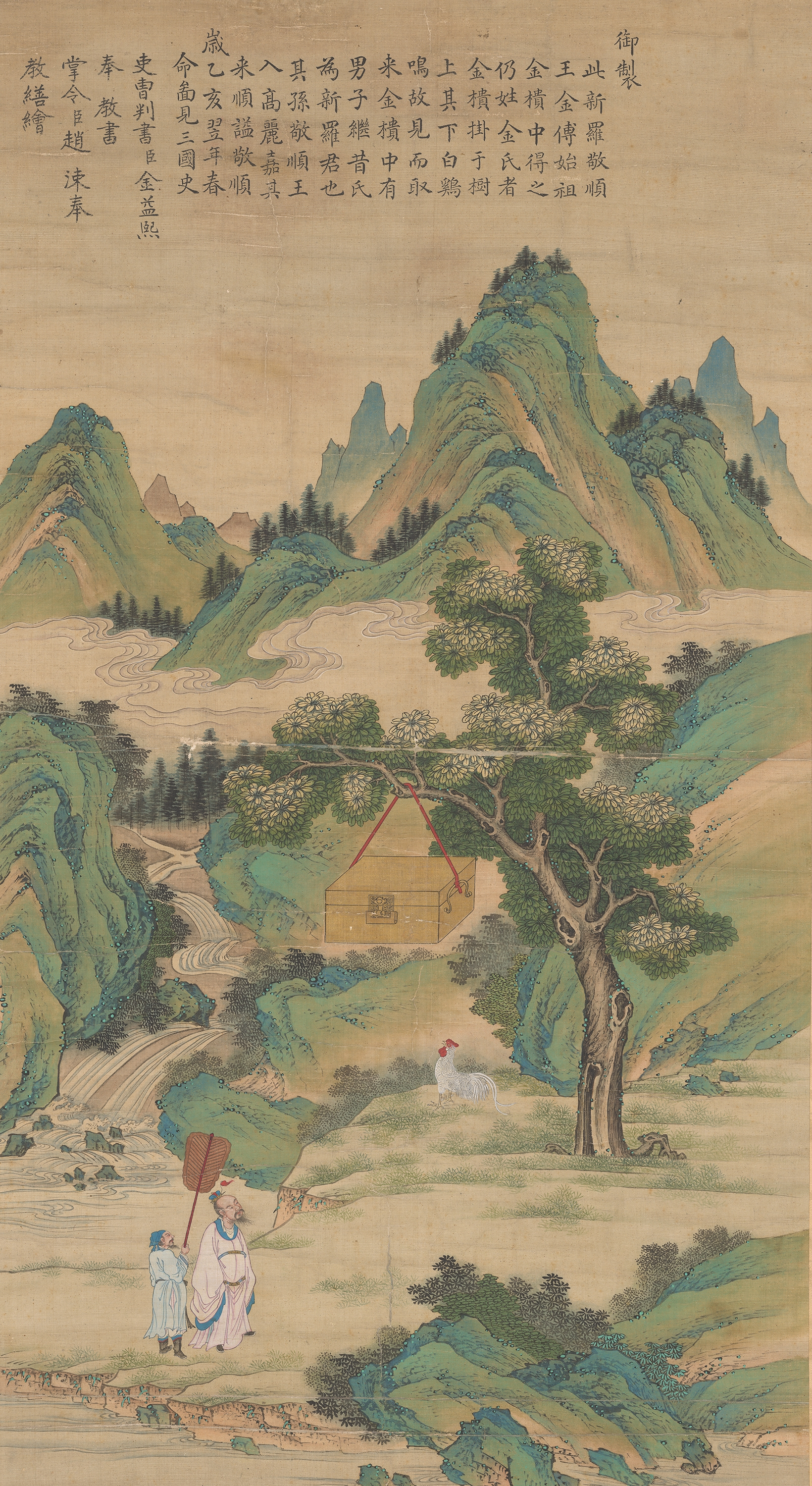
The Golden Chest, 1656

Hogong appears prominently in the Kim foundation myth as well. One night, Hogong sees a great light in the woods. When he goes closer, he discovers a golden chest hanging from a tree and a white rooster crowing below. He opens the chest and discovers a boy, who he names Alji. Alji is brought to court and made the Silla king's heir, but he later abdicates his position. Alji would become the mythical founder of the Kim clan, which would later monopolize the patrilineal line of the Silla kings.

===== Gaya =====
Until their conquest by Silla in the sixth century, the delta of the southern Nakdong River was occupied by the Gaya polities. The Samguk yusa preserves the foundation myth of one of the most powerful Gaya kingdoms, that of Geumgwan Gaya. The nine chieftains of the country hear a strange voice announce that heaven has commanded it to found a kingdom there. After singing and dancing as commanded by the voice, a golden chest wrapped in red cloth descends from heaven. When the chieftains open it, they find six golden eggs. The eggs hatch into giant boys, who fully mature in merely two weeks. On the fifteenth day, the six each become kings of the six Gaya kingdoms. The first to hatch, Suro, becomes king of Geumgwan Gaya.

Later, Suro is challenged by the Seok clan's founder Seok Talhae. According to the history of Gaya given in Samguk yusa, the two engage in a shapeshifting duel, after which Seok acknowledges defeat and flees to Silla. (Note: Iryeon, compiler of the Samguk yusa, acknowledges inconsistencies between the Silla and Gaya accounts.) A beautiful princess named Heo Hwang'ok then arrives on a ship with red sails, bearing great wealth from a distant kingdom called Ayuta. Heo tells Suro that Shangdi has commanded her father to marry her to Suro, and the two become king and queen. They both live for more than 150 years.

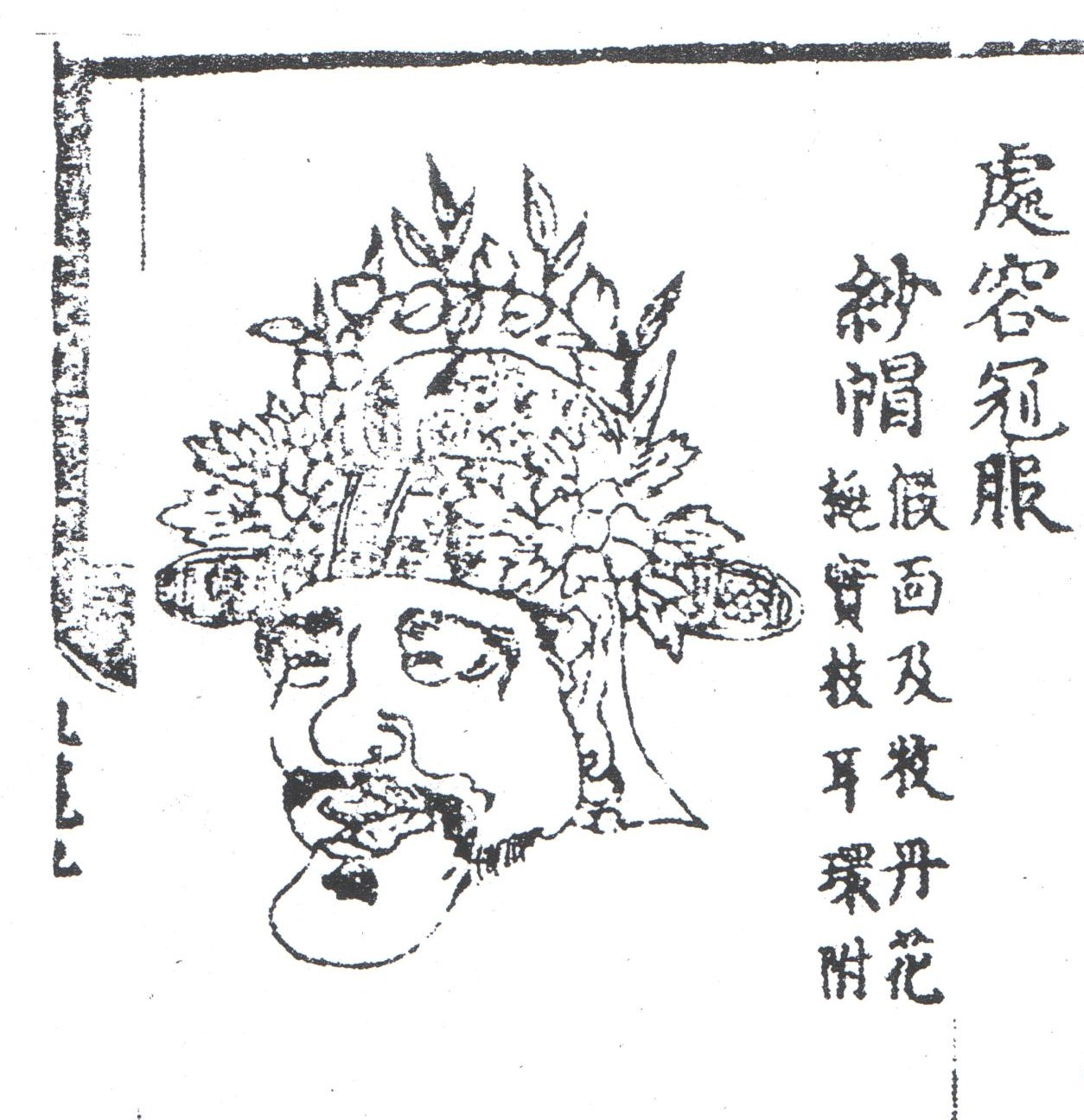
Illustration of Cheoyong in the 1493 Akhak Gwebeom

The foundation myths of Silla and Gaya are of the southern type, with the founder descending directly from heaven on vessels such as eggs and chests. The myths may also reflect real historical figures and processes. Hyeokgeose may therefore symbolize an ancient migration of northern horse-riders who created the state of Silla with the support of local chieftains, while Seok Talhae stands for a maritime group that was defeated by Gaya and was integrated into the Silla state and Heo Hwang'ok preserves the historical memory of a merchant group that contributed to the establishment of the early Geumgwan Gaya polity.

=== Other literary myths ===
Many other supernatural stories are contained in the Samguk yusa to the point that Grayson calls its compiler, Iryeon, "the first Korean folklorist." Some of these stories reflect shamanic mythology. One example is the tale of Cheoyong. Cheoyong, a son of the Dragon King of the East Sea, arrives in the Silla court where he marries a beautiful woman. One night, he goes home to find the smallpox god having sex with his wife. Rather than punish the intruder, Cheoyong only sings a song. The smallpox god is so astounded by his mercy that he repents and agrees to never enter any house with Cheoyong's face on its gate. The people of Silla then attach portraits of Cheoyong to their gates. The story of Cheoyong is traditionally interpreted as the myth of a shaman or benevolent deity who wards off the spirit of pestilence, although the exact relationship between Cheoyong's song (which survives in two different versions) and Korean shamanic chants continues to be debated.

Another genre of literary mythology are the origin myths of specific family lineages, which are recorded in genealogies. The motif of the founding ancestor's birth from a stone or golden chest also appears in the genealogies of many non-royal lineages. Other ancestor myths involve the coupling of a human and a non-human. The Chungju Eo (魚 eo "fish") claim descent from a man who was born to a human mother and a carp father, while the Changnyeong Jo are thought to descend from the offspring of a Silla noblewoman and the son of a dragon.

== Shamanic and oral mythology ==
=== Nature and context ===
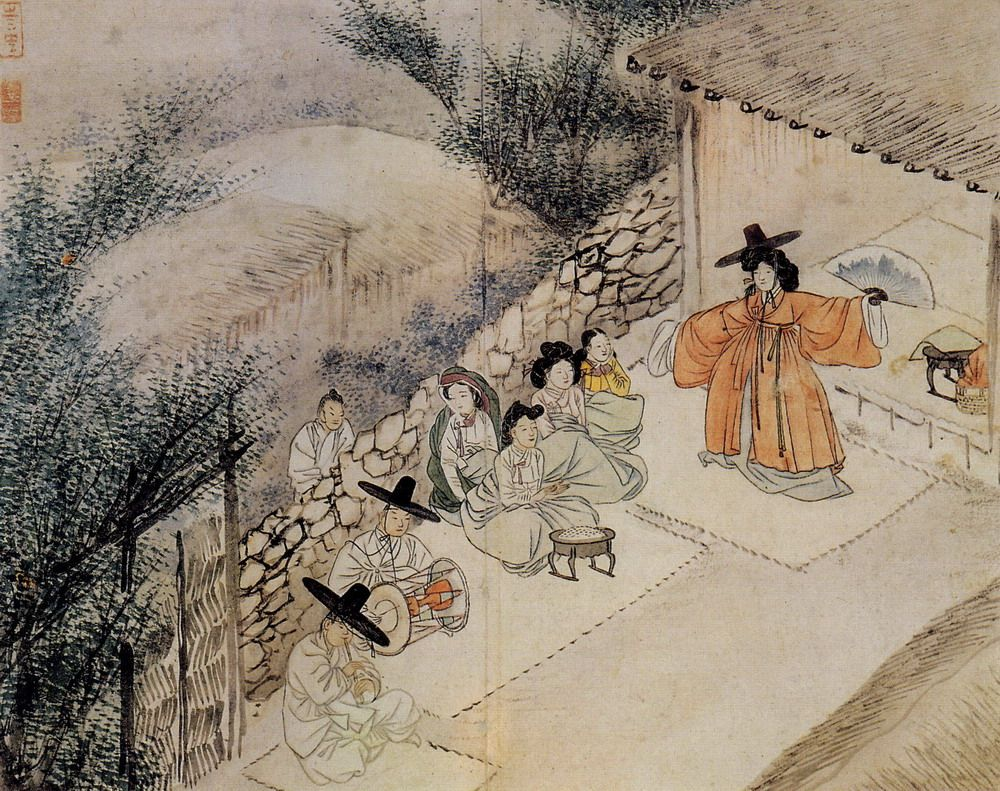
A shaman (in orange) holding a ritual for three noblewomen and their servants. Early 19th century. They meet in secret, perhaps without the husband's knowledge.

The shamanic narratives are works of oral literature sung during gut—the Korean term for large-scale shamanic rituals—which constitute the mythology of Korean shamanism, the indigenous polytheistic religion of the country.

Since the long-ruling Joseon dynasty (1392–1910), the attitude of the Korean population towards the traditional religion has been ambivalent. The Joseon, whose state ideology was Neo-Confucianism, were opposed to shamanism and made significant efforts to eliminate the religion from the public sphere. As Koreans increasingly accepted the Joseon state's patriarchal and anti-shamanic ideology, shamanism became increasingly associated with women, who were also marginalized by the new social structure. It was in this restrained capacity as women's private religion, without public influence, that shamanism was still tolerated by Joseon society.

Despite the continued presence of shamanism as a significant force in Korean religious life, a cultural ambivalence regarding it persists. As of 2016, the capital of Seoul alone has hundreds of ritual places, where gut are held on most days of the year. Yet when in public, many worshipers—often Christians or Buddhists as well as practitioners of shamanism—avoid discussing their shamanic worship and sometimes disparage their own beliefs as superstition.

Reflecting this ambivalence, shamanism and its mythology are often characterized as subversive of Korea's mainstream values and official culture, though some may also simultaneously incorporate more mainstream thinking such as the Confucian virtues. (Note: Some narratives are more supportive of mainstream ideologies such as patriarchal gender roles, while others are more subversive. Cho Hyun-soul gives the Song of Dorang-seonbi and Cheongjeong-gaksi as an example of a myth supportive of patriarchy, and the Segyeong bon-puri as a highly subversive myth.) The story of Princess Bari is a typical example. The myth centers on the princess's journey to the world of the dead to save her parents. The story is thus "an affirmation of a Confucian virtue," that of filial piety. Yet the parents' savior is not a son but a daughter—indeed, the very daughter that Bari's parents abandon at birth merely for being a girl. Later, Bari leaves her husband for her parents, although Confucian culture demands that women transfer their loyalties to their husband's family after marriage. The myth therefore can be interpreted to subvert the Confucian framework of patriarchy using the very values of Confucianism.

All shamanic narratives meet the purposes of both religiosity and entertainment, albeit to varying degrees. Shamanic narratives are almost never sung in non-religious circumstances, and the ritual context is critical to a full understanding of the mythology. For instance, the story of Bari is performed at ceremonies where the soul of the deceased is sent off to the realm of the dead. Bari is the goddess that guides the soul on its way, and the story of the princess's journey thus further reassures the bereaved that the spirit of their loved one is in good hands. At the same time, shamans also seek to entertain worshippers. This may be done by inserting riddles, popular songs, or humorous or sexual descriptions into the retelling of the myth, or by having the accompanying musicians interrupt the narrative with often vulgar jokes. Such humorous elements also helped convey the subversive message of many shamanic myths, such as criticism of gender hierarchies and class structures.

As oral literature, shamanic narratives are also affected by both the received tradition and the performing shaman's original innovations. Many narratives have lengthy formulaic paragraphs and imagery that appear identically throughout multiple versions of the myth or even across multiple myths, and which are memorized by shamans when they first learn the songs. For instance, a series of highly metaphoric descriptions of Bari's mother's pregnancies is found in all regions where the Princess Bari myth is performed. On the other hand, shamans regularly add new content and reword phrases of the narratives, and the same shaman may even sing different variants of the same myth depending on the specific circumstances of the gut. A certain degree of consistency is nonetheless expected; in one case, a Jeju shaman reciting the Chogong bon-puri narrative was interrupted ten times for giving inaccurate details until more experienced shamans demanded that he name the man who taught him. The shamanic mythology is thus unusually conservative for oral literature.

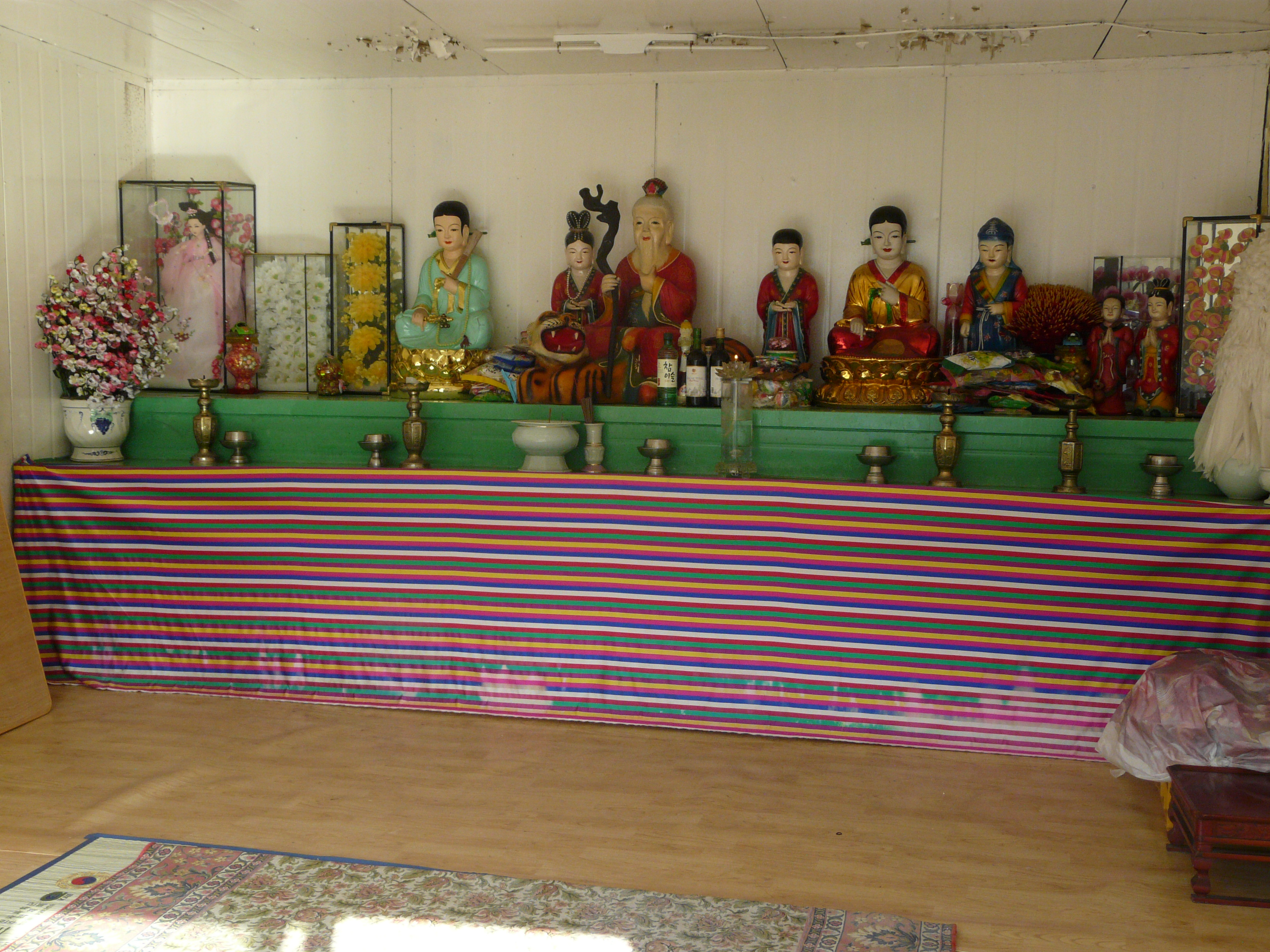
Modern shamanic shrine in Ansan

Unlike the literary mythology, the shamanic mythology is a living tradition capable of creating new narratives. In the 1960s, an unknown shaman in eastern Gangwon Province adapted the Simcheong-ga, a story involving a blind man, into the new Simcheong-gut narrative, recited in order to ward off eye disease. The new myth has since become very popular in the region. Another apparently new myth is the Jemyeon-gut narrative, which appeared in the city of Gangneung for the first time in 1974 despite not being attested when the same ritual was held in 1966 and 1969. The Jemyeon-gut myth has no clear source for its story, and researchers have noted an increase in narrative details from the 1970s to the 1990s. Several other shamanic narratives appear to have been adapted at some point from, or otherwise bear a close relation to, late Joseon-era vernacular literature. Cross-cultural similarities have also been noted between Korean shamanic narratives and other East Asian myths, in particular the mythology of Manchu shamanism.

Korean shamanism is currently undergoing a major restructuring that is not favorable towards a lengthy performance of the mythology. The traditional village community-oriented ceremonies are in decline, while rituals commissioned by individual worshippers are on the rise. The setting of the gut has also shifted to ritual places where only the shamans and the relevant worshippers are present, in contrast to the public participation that was traditional for the ceremonies. Most of these individual worshippers have little interest in the mythology itself, sometimes even leaving when the narrative begins, but are very invested in ceremonies specifically related to themselves or their friends and family, such as the gongsu rite in which the shaman conveys messages directly from the gods to the worshipper. With the emergence of other forms of entertainment, the entertainment value of shamanic rituals has also declined. In at least Seoul, the performance of the Princess Bari is therefore becoming increasingly shorter. As many new shamans now learn narratives from published books or recordings rather than being taught personally by a more experienced shaman as was traditional, the regional diversity of the mythology may also be in decline.

Unlike the Greco-Roman or Norse mythologies familiar to Western readers, the deities of Korean shamanic mythology exist mostly independently of each other. (Note: The village guardian gods of Jeju Island, who form kinship networks, are excluded here.) Each shamanic narrative establishes the nature and functions of the deities it is dedicated to, but there are few cases where gods that have previously appeared in their own narratives interact with each other. It is thus not possible to establish a genealogy of the gods.

=== Regional traditions ===
The shamanic mythology is divided into five regional traditions (무가권; 巫歌圈 muga-gwon), representing the primary variations of the two narratives the Jeseok bon-puri and the Princess Bari, which are both found throughout the Korean peninsula. Each of the five regions also has myths not found in the other regions, as well as distinctive tendencies in the actual performance of the narratives. The mythological tradition of southern Jeju Island is particularly divergent.

A characteristic of Korean mythology is that the corpus is poorest in and near the capital of Seoul—the traditional political, economic, and cultural center of the country—and largest and most diverse in South Hamgyong Province and Jeju Island, the northernmost and southernmost peripheries respectively. The two peripheral mythologies are the most archaic. Several similar myths are found in both Hamgyong and Jeju despite the great distances involved, suggesting that the two mythologies both descend from a common ancient Korean source.

==== Northern ====
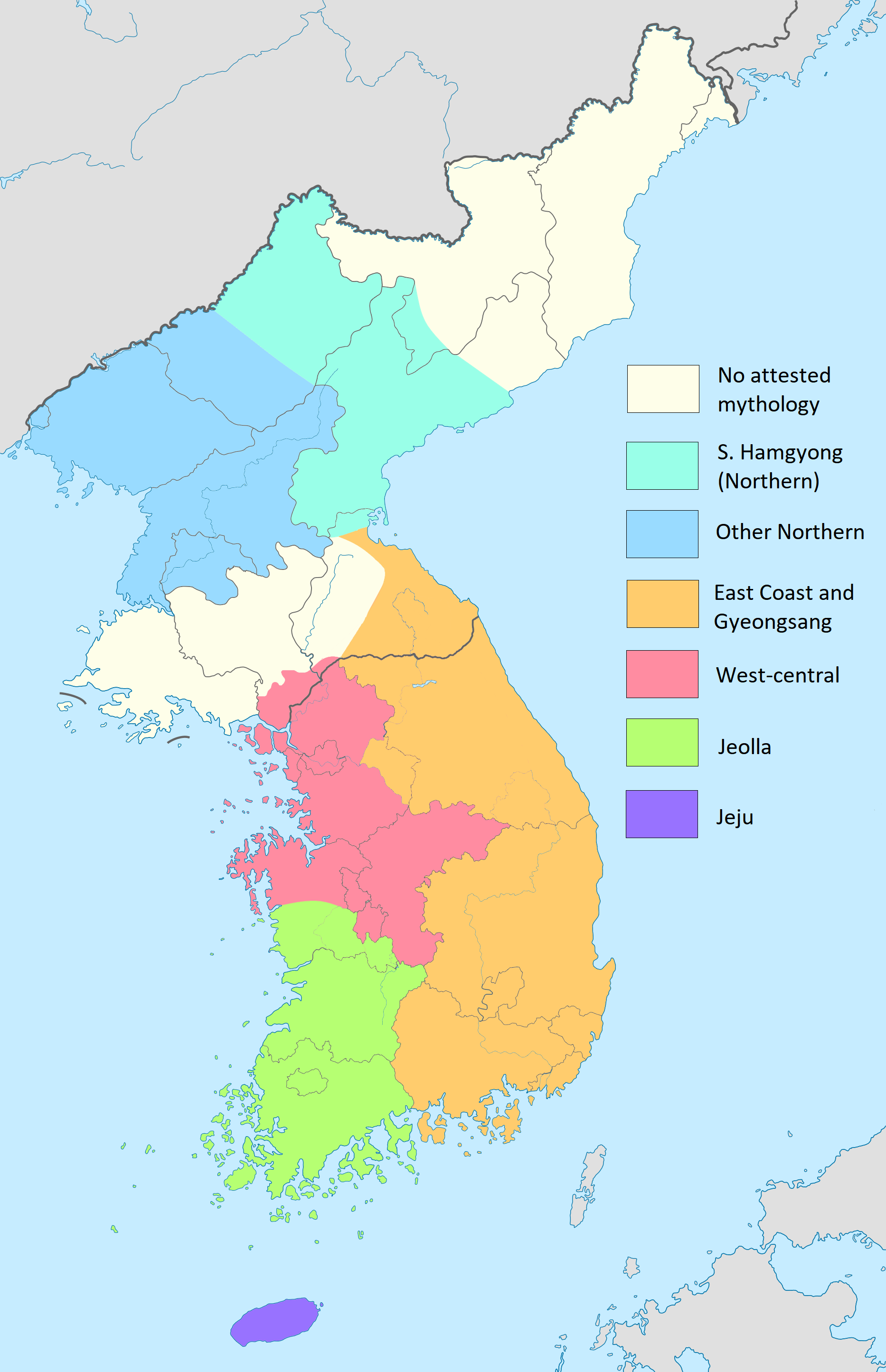
Regional divisions in the shamanic mythology (borders approximate)

The northern tradition is poorly understood because all of its area is now part of North Korea, where ethnographic research is not feasible. Ethnologist Hong Tae-han calls it a grouping made for convenience's sake, as what regional diversity may have existed there is now inaccessible to scholarship. The religion of South Hamgyong Province may form a coherent shamanic tradition independent of other northern shamanism. The South Hamgyong mythology includes a large corpus of unique shamanic narratives, of which the most important is the Song of Dorang-seonbi and Cheongjeong-gaksi, centering on a woman who attempts to meet her beloved husband after his death. Other notable South Hamgyong myths include the Seng-gut narrative, which combines the creation myth and the Jeseok bon-puri; the Donjeon-puri, in which a husband and wife become the gods of money; and the Jim'gajang narrative, about three boys who take vengeance on their murderer by reincarnating as his sons. By contrast, Hwanghae Province in North Korea has virtually no shamanic mythology. The ritual and entertainment role played by mythical narratives in other regions is served by an unusually developed tradition of ceremonial dance and theater.

According to a North Korean shaman who defected in 2008, shamanism is widespread in modern North Korea and de facto condoned by the state, but the old songs and chants are no longer transmitted.

==== West-Central ====
The west-central tradition is the mythological tradition of Seoul and its environs, and is distinguished by a strong emphasis on the sacred nature of the narratives. The recitations are primarily addressed to the deity, not the physically present human worshippers. Formulaic phrases of the received tradition are frequently used. Hong Tae-han characterizes the west-central mythology as the most "solemn" of Korean shamanic narratives. This may be because Seoul shamans frequently held ceremonies in the royal palaces for queens and other court women, who would have expected dignity and gravity from the rituals. This region also has the fewest myths. The only specifically west-central narrative is Seongju-puri, explaining the origins of the patron god of the household. In the city of Seoul itself, Princess Bari is the only shamanic narrative that is performed.

==== East Coast and Gyeongsang ====
In contrast to the west-central tradition, shamans of the East Coast and Gyeongsang tradition do much to make their narratives entertaining for the human worshippers. Narratives are recited with an unusual level of detail, and the diversity of rhetorical techniques is unprecedented. Indeed, Hong Tae-han refers to the East Coast shaman families as "the most skilled performing arts group in the entirety of Korea." The musicians go beyond simply providing background music and intervene directly in the performance, while the performing shaman actively interacts with the human audience. Non-shamanic music, such as folk songs or Buddhist hymns, is integrated into the narrative at appropriate moments. Characteristic regional narratives include a very detailed account of the journeys of the Visitors, the gods of smallpox. The region currently has the most vigorous mythological tradition.

==== Jeolla ====
The Jeolla tradition is characterized by the reduced importance of the pan-Korean narratives, and the greater prominence of two other myths: the Jangja-puri, about a rich man who evades the gods of death, and the Chilseong-puri, featuring seven brothers who become gods of the Big Dipper. As of 2002, the Jeolla mythology was in decline.

==== Jeju ====
The Jeju tradition also stresses the sanctity of the myths to the point that the performing shaman always sings the stories while facing the sacrificial altar, turning their back towards the musicians and worshippers. The explicit purpose of the Jeju mythology, as expressed in many narratives directly, is to make the gods "giddy with delight" by retelling them the story of their lives and deeds. The island has the richest corpus of shamanic narratives. The island represents the only tradition where Princess Bari is unknown. The Jeju mythological tradition is also at risk, as the largest Jeju gut rituals—which take fourteen days to complete—are seldom fully held nowadays. Several myths are already no longer performed by shamans.

=== Creation narratives ===
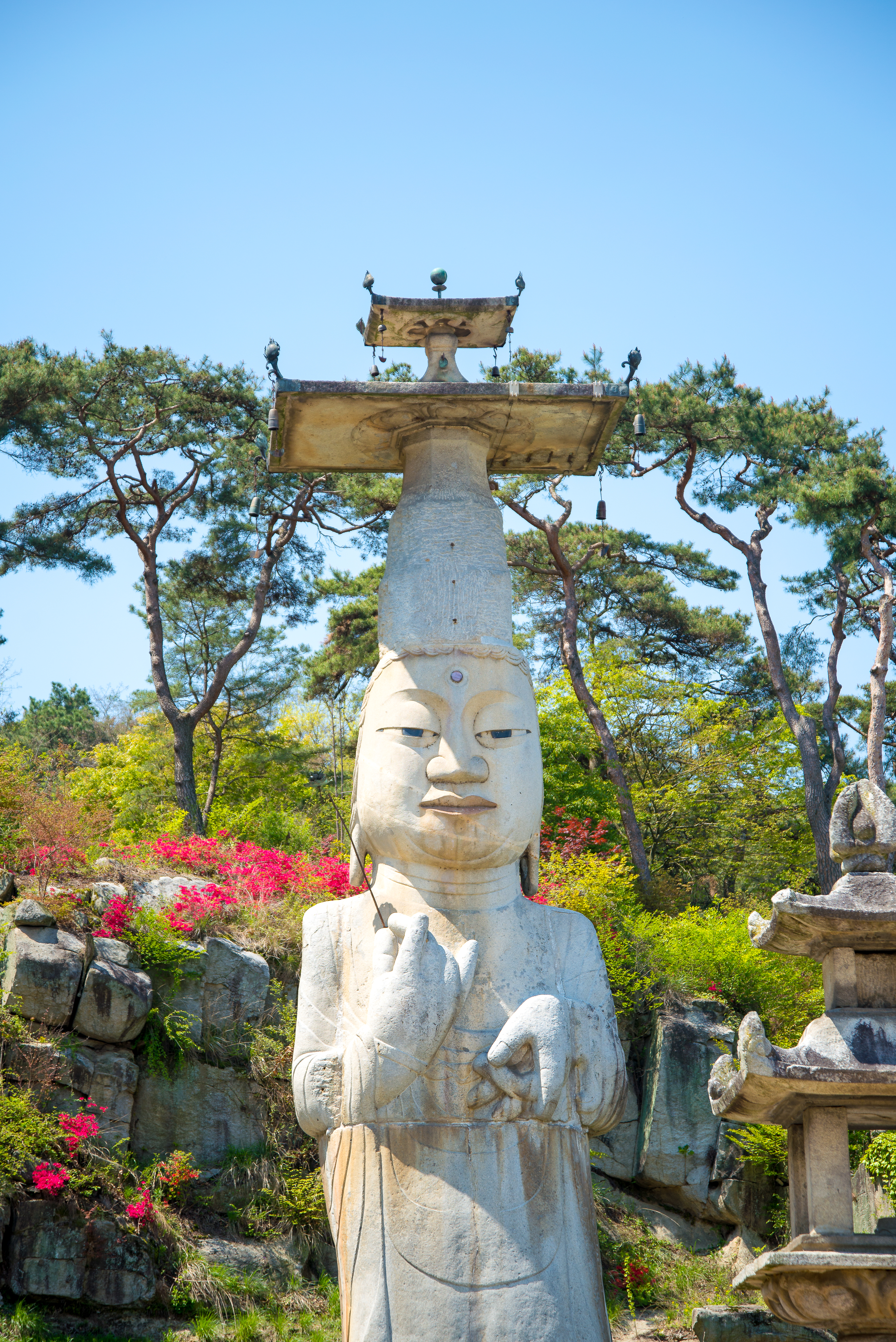
10th-century Korean statue of Maitreya Buddha, or Mireuk, for whom the northern creator is named.

Several Korean shamanic narratives discuss the creation and primordial history of the world. The most complete creation narratives are found in the northern and Jeju traditions, although one is known from the west-central tradition. Several East Coast versions of the Jeseok bon-puri also incorporate relevant elements.

The northern and Jeju creation narratives share many elements. In both traditions, the universe is created with the division of heaven and earth, which were originally fused. A giant is often involved in the creation; in one northern narrative, the creator god Mireuk who cleaves heaven and earth is said to have eaten grain by the seom (180 liters) and to have worn robes with sleeves twenty feet (6.7 meters) long or wide. In both northern and Jeju myths, a benevolent god is challenged by an usurper who claims rule over the human world. The two gods engage in three contests to decide who will rule. In both, the final challenge is a flower-growing contest, in which the god that grows the better flower will take charge of humanity. The benevolent god grows the (better) flower, but the usurper steals it while the other god sleeps. Having won this final contest, the usurper takes control of the world, but his unjust victory is the source of the evil and suffering of the present world. Both northern and Jeju creation myths also tell of how there were once two suns and two moons, making the world very hot during day and very cold during night, until a deity destroys one of each.

Nonetheless, the northern and Jeju creation myths differ significantly in structure. In the north, the two protagonists are the creator Mireuk and the usurper Seokga. Both are Buddhist names, referring to Maitreya and Shakyamuni respectively. But as the myths are otherwise unrelated to Buddhism, they are believed to be indigenous gods whose original names were at some point replaced. The two gods fight two duels of supernatural power—such as making a river freeze in midsummer, or hitting a bottle of liquor midair and having the liquor float in the air even while the bottle shatters and falls—before the final flower contest. In the majority of narratives, the sun and moon double or disappear after Seokga's unjust victory, and the usurper is obliged to embark on a quest to restore cosmic order by retrieving the sun and moon or destroying the doubled ones. Only the northern tradition discusses the creation of humanity; according to one narrative, Mireuk grows insects into humans.

The Jeju creation myth does not show Buddhist influence. In Jeju, the sky god Cheonji-wang descends to earth some time after creation, often to punish an impious man named Sumyeong-jangja. There, he sleeps with an earthly woman and gives her the tokens of two gourd seeds as he returns to the heavens. The woman gives birth to the twins Daebyeol-wang and Sobyeol-wang. When the brothers grow up, they plant the gourd seeds, which grow into gigantic vines that stretch into heaven. The twins climb these vines to enter their father's realm. After verifying their parentage, the twins hold a contest to decide who will rule the human world and who the world of the dead. After two riddle contests, the younger twin wins the final flower contest through cheating and takes charge of the living. The realm of Sobyeol-wang, the physical world where humans live, is full of suffering and disorder. But Daebyeol-wang establishes justice and order for his kingdom of the afterlife, where human souls go after death.

=== Jeseok bon-puri ===
The Jeseok bon-puri is the only truly pan-Korean myth, being found in all five regional traditions. The mainland versions of the narrative recount the origins of the Jeseok gods, (Note: The theonym "Jeseok" is found everywhere except in the East Coast-Gyeongsang tradition, where other theonyms such as "Sejon" are used. Both Jeseok and Sejon are Buddhist names; 제석; 帝釋 Jeseok is the Korean name of the Buddhist god Indra, and 세존; 世尊 Sejon "world-honored" is an East Asian epithet of the Buddha. The worship of Sejon is also associated with fertility.) fertility deities that guarantee fortune and agricultural prosperity, as well as often Samsin, the goddess of childbirth. As of the year 2000, there were sixty-one known versions of the Jeseok bon-puri, excluding the highly divergent Jeju versions.

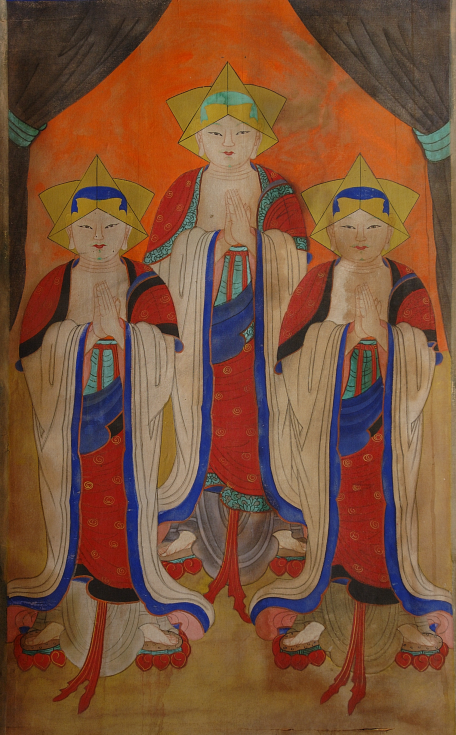
Painting of the Samsin Jeseok at a shamanic shrine in Yongsan District, Seoul, 19th century

All versions share the following basic narrative structure. Danggeum-aegi is the virgin daughter of a nobleman. When her parents and brothers are temporarily absent, a Buddhist priest comes on an alms round to her house. Danggeum-aegi gives alms in the form of rice, but the priest usually stalls for time by spilling all the rice that she gives, so that she must pick them up and offer them again.

In the Jeolla tradition, the priest then briefly grasps her wrist before leaving. In the west-central tradition, Danggeum-aegi eats three of the grains of rice that the priest has spilled. In the northern and East Coast-Gyeongsang traditions, the girl offers the priest lodging in her father's room, but he refuses. He consecutively rejects her offer of every room in the mansion until she agrees to share her own room with him, where they have sex. In any case, the girl becomes pregnant. When her family returns, they attempt to kill her to salvage the family's honor but fail, sometimes because rocks and earth fall on top of her parents and brothers while celestial light shines on the girl.

In the west-central and Jeolla traditions, they then expel her from the household. Danggeum-aegi successfully finds the priest and gives birth in his presence to sons, usually but not always triplets. The priest abandons Buddhism and starts a family with her and the sons. In the Jeolla tradition, the myth ends here without anybody becoming gods. In the west-central tradition, the priest confers divinity upon his sons with Danggeum-aegi as the Jeseok gods.

In the northern and East Coast-Gyeongsang traditions, the family imprisons Danggeum-aegi in a pit or stone chest, but she miraculously survives and always gives birth to triplet sons. Danggeum-aegi is then brought back to the family. In most versions, the triplets prove to be supernaturally talented, such that the other children repeatedly attempt and fail to murder them out of envy. One day, the triplets ask who their father is. Danggeum-aegi usually gives the names of various trees as their father, but each tree tells the triplets that she is lying. Once she admits the truth, the brothers go out to find their father. When they reach the priest's temple, he gives them a series of impossible tasks to verify their parentage. This includes walking in water while wearing paper shoes without making any of the paper wet, crossing a river using only the bones of cows dead for three years, creating a rooster out of straw that perches and crows, and eating a fish and then vomiting it out alive. The triplets succeed in all these tasks, and the priest acknowledges that they are his sons when he sees that his blood mingles with the triplets'. The priest then makes Danggeum-aegi the goddess of childbirth, and the triplets either the Jeseok gods or a group of equivalent fertility deities.

In the northern and eastern traditions, the Jeseok bon-puri is often linked to the creation narrative, with the usurper Seokga being the same god as the priest who impregnates Danggeum-aegi. According to Hong Tae-han, the Jeseok bon-puri was probably originally episodes in a longer narrative centering on the deeds of the creator god, as still seen today in the South Hamgyong Seng-gut narrative. The northern versions where the Jeseok bon-puri follows the creation narrative are thus the most archaic.

Despite the Buddhist veneer, the priest has many attributes of a sky god. In various versions, the priest is said to live in the palace of the heavens, or to ride into his home in the clouds on a paper horse, or to take Danggeum-aegi with him on a journey to heaven using a rainbow as a bridge. Many versions refer to the priest or his temple as "Golden" (황금; 黃金 hwanggeum), which may be a corruption of the archaic Middle Korean phrase han kem (한 ᄀᆞᆷ) "the Great God." The myth is thus one in which an earthly woman is impregnated by a celestial male figure and gives birth to children who become the objects of worship. Scholars have noted parallels between the meeting of the girl and the priest and the meeting of Yuhwa and Haemosu in the Goguryeo founding myth, and between the triplets' quest to find their father and their subsequent attainment of divinity and Yuri's quest to find Jumong and his subsequent coronation as king.

=== Princess Bari ===
The Princess Bari narrative is found in all regions except Jeju. Roughly one hundred versions of the myth have been transcribed by scholars as of 2016, and around half of those since 1997. As of 1998, all known versions were sung only during gut rituals held for the deceased. Princess Bari is therefore a goddess closely associated with funeral rites. Bari's exact role varies according to the version, sometimes failing to become a deity at all, but she is usually identified as the patron goddess of shamans, the conductor of the souls of the dead, or the goddess of the Big Dipper.

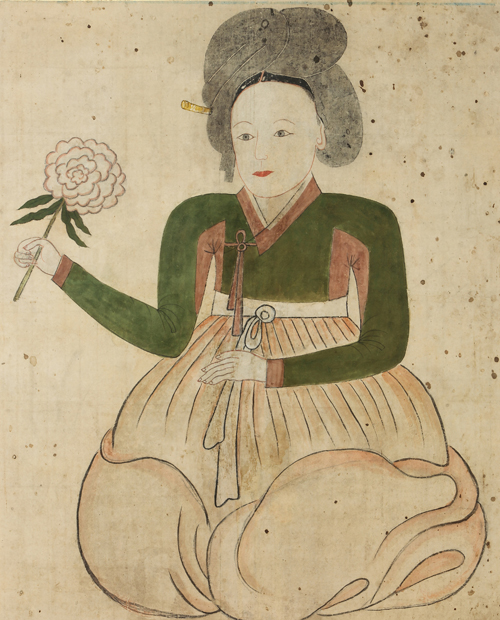
Princess Bari holding the flower of resurrection. Painting for shamanic rituals, 18th century.

Despite the large number of versions, most agree upon the basic story. The first major episode shared by almost all versions is the marriage of the king and queen. The queen gives birth to six consecutive daughters who are treated luxuriously. When she is pregnant a seventh time, the queen has an auspicious dream. The royal couple takes this as a sign that she is finally bearing a son and prepares the festivities. Unfortunately, the child is a girl. The disappointed king orders the daughter to be thrown away, dubbing her Bari, from Korean 버리 beori "to throw away." (Note: Or 바리데기 Bari-degi "thrown-away baby") In some versions, she must be abandoned two or three times because she is protected by animals the first and second times. The girl is then rescued by a figure such as the Buddha (who regrets upon seeing her that he cannot take a woman as his disciple), a mountain god, or a stork.

Once Bari has grown, one or both of her parents fall gravely ill. They learn that the disease can only be cured through medicinal water from the Western Heaven. In the majority of versions, the king and queen ask their six older daughters to go fetch the water, but all of them refuse. Desperate, the king and queen order Princess Bari to be found again. In other versions, the royal couple is told in a dream or a prophecy to find their daughter. In any case, Bari is brought to court. She agrees to go to the Western Heaven and departs, usually wearing the robes of a man.

The details of Bari's quest differ according to the version. In one of the oldest recorded narratives, recited by a shaman from near Seoul in the 1930s, she meets the Buddha after having gone three thousand leagues. Seeing through her disguise and remarking that she is a woman, the Buddha asks if she can truly go another three thousand leagues. When Bari responds that she will keep going even if she is to die, he gives her a silk flower, which turns a vast ocean into land for her to cross. She then liberates hundreds of millions of dead souls who are imprisoned in a towering fortress of thorns and steel.

When Bari finally arrives at the site of the medicinal water, she finds it defended by a supernatural guardian (of varying nature) who also knows that she is a woman, and obliges her to work for him and bear him sons. Once this is done―she may give birth to as many as twelve sons, depending on the version―she is allowed to return with the medicinal water and the flowers of resurrection. When she returns, she finds that her parents (or parent) have already died and that their funerals are being held. She interrupts the funeral procession, opens the coffin lids, and resurrects her parents with the flowers and cures them with the water. In most versions, the princess then attains divinity.

Each of the four mainland regional traditions feature distinctive elements of the Princess Bari. The west-central tradition is marked by strong Buddhist influence. The rescuer is always the Buddha, who brings her to be raised by an old childless couple who are said to desire good karma. The East Coast and Gyeongsang tradition elaborates the most on Bari's quest, and portrays the guardian of the medicinal water as an exiled god who must have sons in order to return to heaven. The Jeolla tradition is the least detailed, and does not mention Bari dressing as a man. There is great diversity within regions. For instance, the aforementioned 1930s version mentions a wood of resurrection, although most other versions, including other west-central ones, involve a flower.

The northern tradition is represented by only two versions, both from South Hamgyong, but feature remarkable differences. The princess does not reach the divine realm on her own, but through divine mercy. There, Bari steals the flowers of resurrection and flees. She suddenly dies at the end of the narrative without becoming a goddess, and the mother that she resurrected dies soon after. Her divine role in funerals as the link between the living world and the afterlife is replaced by the local goddess Cheongjeong-gaksi.

The Princess Bari has traditionally had an informal association with the royal court, and there is some evidence that its performance was patronized by King Jeongjo for the soul of his father, Prince Sado, who starved to death in a rice chest in 1762. According to modern Seoul shamans, an older version of the narrative had much jargon that was specific to the Korean court. Parallels to the Manchu folktale Tale of the Nishan Shaman have also been drawn.

=== Localized mainland narratives ===
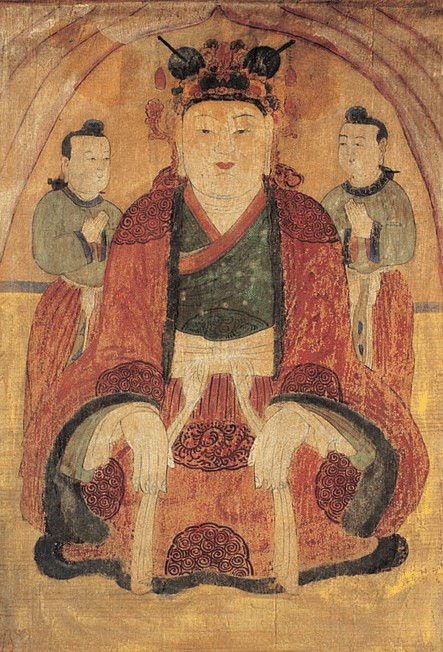
A smallpox goddess (not necessarily the one in the narrative) with two retainers

The vast majority of mainland shamanic narratives are localized, being transmitted only in one or two specific regional traditions. South Hamgyong Province was particularly rich in these localized myths, with nine different narratives recited during the Mangmuk-gut funerary ritual alone. One of the most popular myths in South Hamgyong was the Song of Dorang-seonbi and Cheongjeong-gaksi. The myth centers on a woman named Cheongjeong-gaksi, who is devastated by the death of her husband Dorang-seonbi. The priest from the Golden Temple gives her a series of tasks in order to meet her husband again. This includes tearing out all her hair, twisting them into a rope, boring holes into her palms, and hanging from the rope in the middle of the air, with the rope passing through her palms, without screaming in pain; immersing her fingers in oil for three years, then praying while setting them on fire; and, finally, paving rough mountain roads with only what remains of her bare hands.

Despite succeeding in all this, she can only temporarily be reunited with Dorang-seonbi. In one version, the husband drowns in an accident the same day he is revived. As he dies, he tells his wife to commit suicide so that they can meet again. Cheongjeong-gaksi hangs herself and is united with her husband in the afterlife. Some time later, they both become gods. Dorang-seonbi and Cheongjeong-gaksi were the most important of the deities invoked in the Mangmuk-gut funeral, and were even worshipped in Buddhist temples as second only to the Buddha himself.

In a testimony to the diversity of Korean mythology, the localized narrative of the Visitors (손님네 sonnim-ne), a group of wandering male and female smallpox gods most prominent in the East Coast-Gyeongsang tradition, (Note: The narrative is also found in the Jeolla tradition and occasionally in the west-central tradition, but always in an incomplete form without the Visitors' struggles with Kim-jangja.) covers entirely different themes from the tragic romance above. The narrative was traditionally performed to appease these dangerous deities during smallpox epidemics so they would inflict only light cases of the disease, and also to forestall potential epidemics. In a typical version performed in 1987, three of the Visitors, a group of male and female smallpox gods living in China, decide to visit Korea one day. The ferryman on the border demands that a female Visitor have sex with him to cross. The goddess immediately kills him and consecutively kills six of his seven children with smallpox. When his wife begs for mercy, she lets the youngest live as a blind, immobile hunchback.

In Seoul, the Visitors are chased away from the house of the wealthy Kim-jangja and lodge at the house of a poor crone. In return for her hospitality, the gods reward her and her granddaughter with great fortune. The crone also requests that the Visitors bless Cheolhyeon, Kim-jangja's fifteen-year-old son who she used to nurse. But when Kim-jangja rejects the Visitors a second time, the female Visitor takes the form of Cheolhyeon's mother in order to lure him away and gives him a severe case of smallpox. Kim-jangja vows to sacrifice a calf for the gods, only to refuse the sacrifice when the Visitors recall the illness in response. The outraged gods kill Cheolhyeon, who becomes the youngest Visitor. Later, the Visitors discover that Kim-jangja has been reduced to poverty and that he has no children left due to Cheolhyeon's death. They take pity on him and give the 70-year-old Kim-jangja a new son.

=== Jeju narratives ===
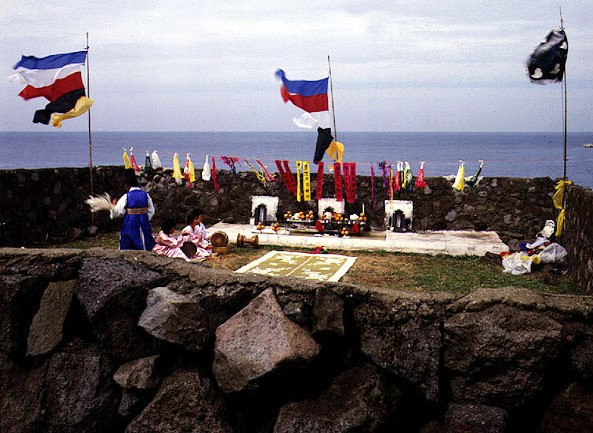
Gut in Jeju Island. They are said to be the same as the ones the triplets performed to resurrect Noga-danpung-agassi in the Chogong bon-puri.

The Jeju tradition has the richest mythology. Its corpus of shamanic narratives, called bon-puri (본풀이), is divided into three or four categories. The approximately dozen general bon-puri are known by all shamans, and involve deities with universal functions who are worshipped throughout the island. The village-shrine bon-puri feature the guardian gods of a specific village, and are known only by shamans from the relevant village and its neighbors. The ancestral bon-puri are about the patron gods of specific families or occupations; despite the name of the category, the god is often not perceived as an actual ancestor. They are known only by shamans from the family or occupation in question, and are thus poorly understood. Some analyses also include a small fourth category of "special bon-puri," which are no longer ritually performed by shamans.

Many general bon-puri are clearly related to mainland narratives but have distinctive Jeju characteristics. A typical example is the Chogong bon-puri, the Jeju version of the Jeseok bon-puri but with a very different ritual function. The early part of the Chogong bon-puri is similar to Jeseok bon-puri versions from Jeolla, the closest part of the mainland. After being supernaturally impregnated, the teenage Noga-danpung-agassi (the Jeju equivalent of the mainland Danggeum-aegi) is expelled from home and goes in search for the priest. But in Jeju, the priest sends her away to give birth to the triplets alone. Unlike in Jeolla, but like in the northern and eastern traditions, the triplets grow up fatherless.

When they best three thousand Confucian scholars in the civil service examinations, the jealous scholars murder Noga-danpung-agassi. The triplets visit their father for help, and the priest makes them abandon their previous life and initiates them into shamanism. The triplets hold the first shamanic rituals to successfully resurrect their mother, then become divine judges of the dead in order to bring justice to the scholars in the afterlife. When asked about the origin of a ritual, Jeju shamans respond that "it was done that way in the Chogong bon-puri."

Village-shrine bon-puri are dedicated to the patron gods of one or multiple villages. Most fit a formulaic structure. In their most complete form, a carnivorous hunting god emerges from the hills of Jeju and an agricultural goddess arrives from overseas, often China. The two marry and become village gods, but then separate, generally because the goddess cannot stand the god's foul habits or the stench of his meat. The goddess then gives birth to a third god, who is expelled from the island and goes on adventures abroad before returning to settle as the god of a different village. Many villages have only parts of this structure, so that the bon-puri ends with the marriage or even involves only the emergence or arrival of the deity. Many Jeju village gods are also thought to be related to one another. Among the most important village bon-puri is thus the one dedicated to the gods of Songdang shrine, who are the parents or grandparents of 424 guardian gods of various villages and locations on the island.

=== Mainland village-shrine myths ===
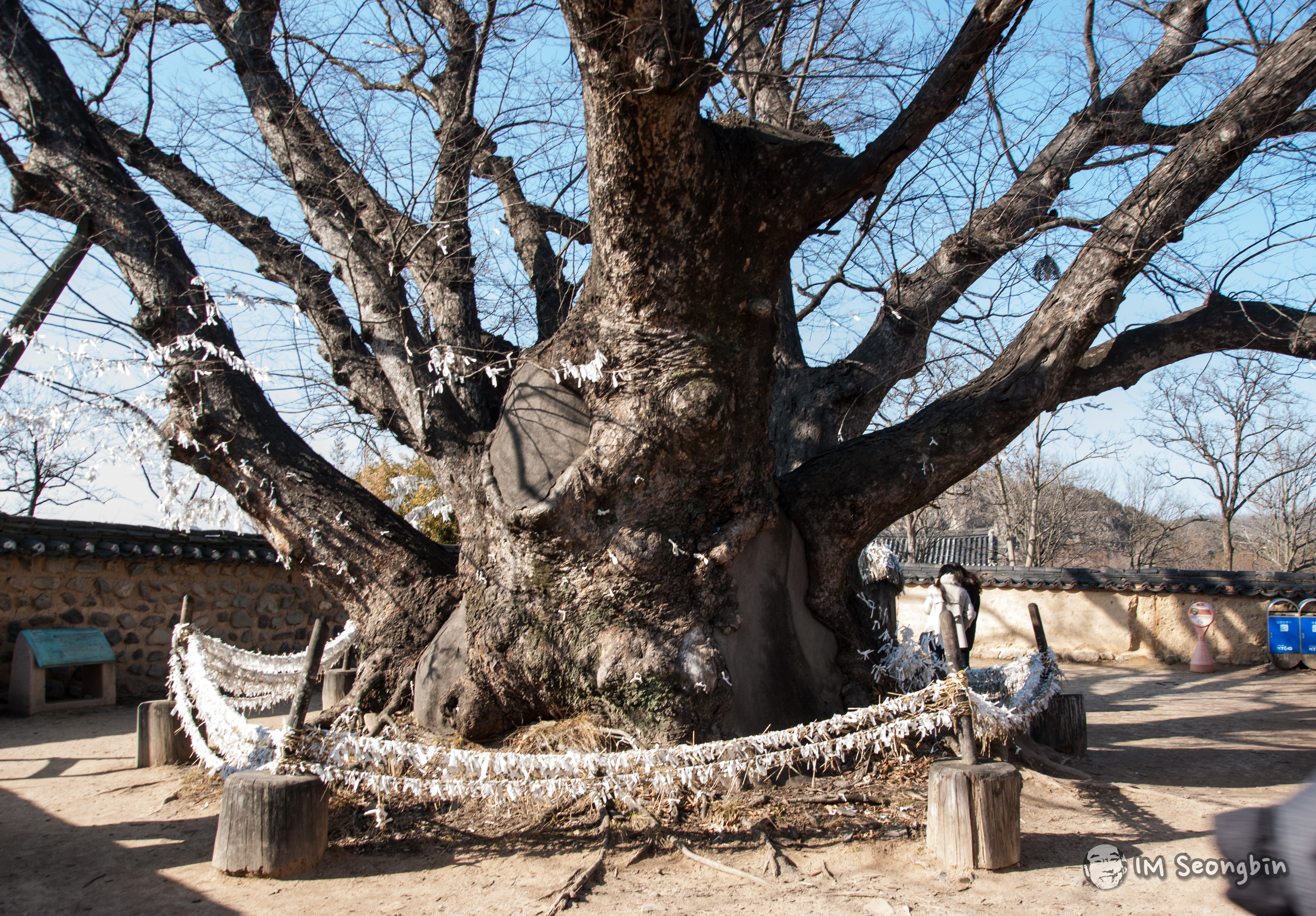
Village guardian tree in Andong, encircled by sacred rope (geumjul)

As in Jeju, mainland Korean villages are traditionally associated with specific guardian deities. The Joseon dynasty strongly promoted Confucian-style worship for these gods over traditional shamanic practices. By the late nineteenth century, most important rituals for village gods were being held by men according to Confucian norms, complete with invocations in Chinese instead of Korean. The sacred stories associated with these gods are therefore not (or no longer) shamanic narratives, except in Jeju Island.

Nonetheless, many such stories reflect shamanic beliefs, such as the emphasis on appeasing sorrowful spirits. Like the shamanic narratives, village-shrine myths are closely associated with rituals dedicated to the god, often explaining the identity of the deity that is venerated. The village mythology is also a living one. For example, it is now believed in the village of Soya, in North Gyeongsang Province, that the local guardian god accurately predicted which soldiers from the village would survive World War II.

In a study of 94 village-shrine myths from South Jeolla Province, Pyo In-ju divides the myths into two major categories, depending on whether the god is identified as a natural object or a human spirit. The most prominent natural objects in the myths are trees, dragons, and rocks. In the village of Jangdong in Gwangyang, for example, a local tree is said to have wept one day during the 1592 Japanese invasion. While all the villagers crowded to the tree at this strange sound, the Japanese attacked. Finding the village abandoned, they suspected a trap and left. A few days later, the Japanese returned and attempted to cut down the tree, but the tree dropped giant branches on them and killed them all. The Japanese never dared approach the village afterwards. Ever since, locals have worshipped the tree as a god.

Village gods identified as the spirits of humans are often the founder of the village, or alternatively a sorrowful spirit (원혼; 願魂, wonhon) which has remained in the human world after death because of their grief or resentment, for instance because they were murdered or because they died as a child.

== In popular culture ==
The state-foundation myths have been adapted into several South Korean TV series, such as the popular 2006 series Jumong, but their potential in popular culture is limited due to the small size of the corpus and the lack of thematic diversity. In recent years, the larger and more diverse shamanic mythology has also appeared in South Korean culture beyond its ritual context. The shamanic narrative best known in South Korea is the Princess Bari in large part due to the work of feminists since the 1990s, who highlighted the myth's characteristics as women's literature. The goddess has since appeared in mediums as diverse as flash games to musicals. In 2007, Hwang Sok-yong—one of the country's most important living novelists—published Bari-degi, a novel set in the modern day about a girl named Bari, whose life parallels the myth of her divine namesake. Other shamanic narratives have also recently entered popular culture, notably in the 2010s Webtoon Along with the Gods, which draws heavily on Jeju bon-puri. However, much of the shamanic mythology remains largely unknown to the South Korean public.

In June 2025, the Netflix movie K-Pop Demon Hunters released, with many of the film's characters being based on Korean myths.

== Korean pantheon ==
Historically Korea has not preserved complete genealogies of its mythological deities. Except in rare cases, such as Goguryeo and its lineage to its sun god, the polytheistic faith of Korea has traditionally been passed on orally. Each shaman has their own individual repertoires of Korean deities and spirits, each with varying personalities, myths, abilities, and family trees. Moreover, the prestige and organizational superiority from the influences of Buddhism, Confucianism, and Daoism played an impact in shaping and creating deities and altering names and stories. Therefore, it is difficult to make a concrete list of all Korean deities which and gods, however below are a list of common gods appearing in folklore.

Gods are most commonly called sin or shin (신, 神), a Sino-Korean word. Other terms such as geom, gom, gam, and suri are older native terms meaning god, and now largely exist as morphemes. and rarely as independent terms. Some carry certain suffixes such as -nim, -doryeong, and -manura, which now mean "master" or "leader" and once carried a divine or higher status. The terms and suffixes of Halmi and the Jeju form Halmang are cognates with Halmoni which meant "Great-Mother", and in the context of these names usually did not necessarily carry a meaning of an elderly grandmother, rather a literal giant woman.

Below are a list of common gods appearing in folklore.

Major deities

- Haneunim, Hanunim, or Hanulnim (하느님): The chief sky deity in Korean mythology ('sky or heaven master'), associated with and also called Hwanin.
- Ungnyeo (웅녀): The bear goddess and a creator deity, the wife of the son of Haneunim named Hwanung and mother of Tan'gun. Sometimes associated with Komnaru or Komanaru ('bear port'), also called Ungjin region of Baekje.
- Daungun Wanggeom (단군왕검): The first monarch and founding god of Korea. It is believed that Dangun means "shaman" and Wanggeom was once Nimgom or Isagum meaning "God King".
- Mago-Halmi (마고할미): An earth goddess and creator deity, sometimes associated with splitting the heaven and earth. "Mago" is likely related to Daoist Magu deity, and she is also called Seolmundae, Seogu, and Angadak in other regions of Korea.
- Baridegi (바리데기): The ancestral deities of shamans who, according to legends, helped resurrect her father King Ogu and subsequently became a guider of souls after death.
- Gangrim Doryeong (강림도령): a guide and grim reaper in southern Korean mythologies. Korea has a multitude of "grim reapers" with specific duties linked to specific deaths. Gangrim and deities named Haewonmaek (해원맥) and Idokchon (이덕춘), are the most popular "grim reapers" especially after Along with the Gods.
- Gosure (고수레): A general term for agricultural deities though to derive from Gosi, a grain deity. Its invocation is closely associated with the following deities:
  - Pungbaek (풍백), Unsa (운사), and Usa (우사): Gods of wind, clouds, and rain identified in the Dangun myth.
  - Jachongbi (자청비), Mun-doryeong (문도령), and Jong-doryeong (정도령): Agricultural deities of Jeju found in the Segyong-bonpuri (세경본풀이).
  - Yeongdeung-halmang (영등할망): A goddess of wind found in Jeju and southern Korea. According to legend, she distributes seafood along the coasts once a year.
- Onari (오날이): A goddess of seasons found in the Jeju Woncheonggang-bonpuri.
- Samsin Halmoni (삼신할머니): a goddess of childbirth, who governs destiny of children until they reach the age of 7.
- Chilseongsin (칠성신): Literally meaning "Gods of the seven stars", a collective of deities of destiny and fate, stemming from ancient worship of the Big Dipper. Also called Chilseong-nim, it is depicted as seven twins, sometimes of varying genders, or as old government officials, or as a snake in Jeju and the south.
- Gameunjang'agi (감은장아기): a goddess of fate and human fortune found in the Jeju Samgongmaji ritual.
- Duduri (두두리): A spirit of the forest, worshipped in ancient Korea as a tutelary deity and a god of war.
- Saradoryong (사라도령): Mentioned in the Igong-bonpuri, a god also called King Sarasu, a god of the afterlife ruling heaven.

Other deities and famous defied people

- Kaeyang-hami (개양할미): A sea goddess and protector of sailors and fishermen in the Yellow Sea, cult of worship centered at Buan county, South Korea.
- Goeulla (고을나), Yangeulla (양을나), and Bueulla (부을나): Ancestral founders of Jeju, emerged from a divine cave in Jeju City.
- Seolmundae Halmang (설문대할망): Creator of Jeju who built the island itself.
- Jeoseung-halmang (저승할망): Appears in the Samseung-halmang-bonpuri. Along with the deity Daebyeol Sangsin, they oppose Samsin Halmoni and were the predecessor gods of childbirth and adolescence before becoming gods of death.
- Nongnyo Hogukjimosin (녹녀호국지모신/녹족부인): A divine doe spirit, also more simply called Lady Nokjok (Nokjok-buin), said to be an ancestral village goddess specifically in the Pyongyang and North Korean region. It is said to be a lingering element of a Goguryeo mythology which itself potentially reflects a martial form of worship connected with Xianbei and Khitan peoples whom Goguryeo was often at war with.
- Samgi Hosin (삼기호신): A divine fox spirit of Samgi mountain (비장산), worshipped in the southeastern region of Korea that according to the Sui-jon, helped the monk Won'gwan establish Gumgok temple in the 7th century.
- King Munmu (문무왕): Legends say that he became the Dragon King God in the Sea of Japan
- Chang Bogo (장보고): A Silla period maritime figure in the 8th and 9th centuries who is venerated as a military god and sea god.
- Yi Sunshin (이순신): A Joseon period admiral who helped defend Korea in late 16th century, venerated as a god of war. Korea did not have one singular tutelary god of war and instead venerated a multitude of deities associated with battle, many of whom were defied generals. Otherwise, founding ancestor gods or gods of heaven were broadly worshipped for luck and success in battle.
- Kang Gamchan (강감찬): A Goryeo period general of the 10th-11th centuries.
- Kim Yushin (김유신): A 7th century Sillan general who helped unify Korea, a war god.

Historical gods

- Hae Mosu (해모수): God of the Sun of Goguryeo and Baekje who founded Buyeo.
- Habaek (하백): The god of water in Goguryeo, localized as the god of the Yalu river. Also called Habal.
- Chumo (추모): The founder of Goguryeo and reported son of the sun god (Hae Mosu) and the daughter of the god of water.
- Yuhwa (유화): Mother of Chumo and daughter of Habaek, worshipped as the goddess of fertility and agriculture in Goguryeo.
- Soeburi-sin (쇠부리신): Goguryeo god of iron forgery, a literal translation for "smelting iron deity" (冶鐵神).
- Kahan-sin (가한신): A Goguryeo god recorded by the Tang dynasty. Possible that he is related to water or the title Khan.
- Kija-sin (기자신): A Goguryeo God recorded by the Tang dynasty. Kija can be assumed to be related to an old Korean term *keci or *kisi meaning 'king/leader'. This word, found throughout the Three Kingdoms as Kilji (吉之) or Kilcha (吉次) in Baekje and Silla and Kaecha (皆次) in Goguryeo, is likely to have been conflated with the similar sounding Chinese figure of Gija who was appropriated by influential Chinese and Koreans to claim legitimacy.
- Yongsong-sin (영성신): A Chinese transcription for a Goguryeo god literally meaning "star spirit deity"
- King Daemusin (대무신왕) Koru (거루): A Goguryeo war god and his divine horse.
- Somori-sin (소머리신): A Goguryeo god of agriculture, has the head of a cow similar to Shennong of China.
- Gutae (구태): A king and first founder worship as a god in Baekje.
- Seondo-seongmo (선도성모): Goddess of Mount Seondosan in Gyeongju and mother of Hyeokgeose, worshipped in Silla and Gaya.
- Hyeokgeose (혁거세): The founder of Silla. Like Chumo, his name was probably read as Bulgeunae in native Korean meaning "bright world". Chumo's Dongmyeong could be read as Saebal, meaning "bright east".
- Ibigaji (이비가지): A god of heaven worshipped in Gaya as an ancestral deity.
- Jeonggyeon-moju (정견모주): A goddess worshipped in Gaya as an ancestral deity and wife of Ibigaji, giving birth to Ijinasi, founder of Gaya.

== See also ==
- Chinese mythology
- Japanese mythology
- Mongol mythology
- Manchu shamanism
- Vietnamese mythology
