= Jeju Gotjawal Provincial Park =

Park in Seogwipo, South Korea

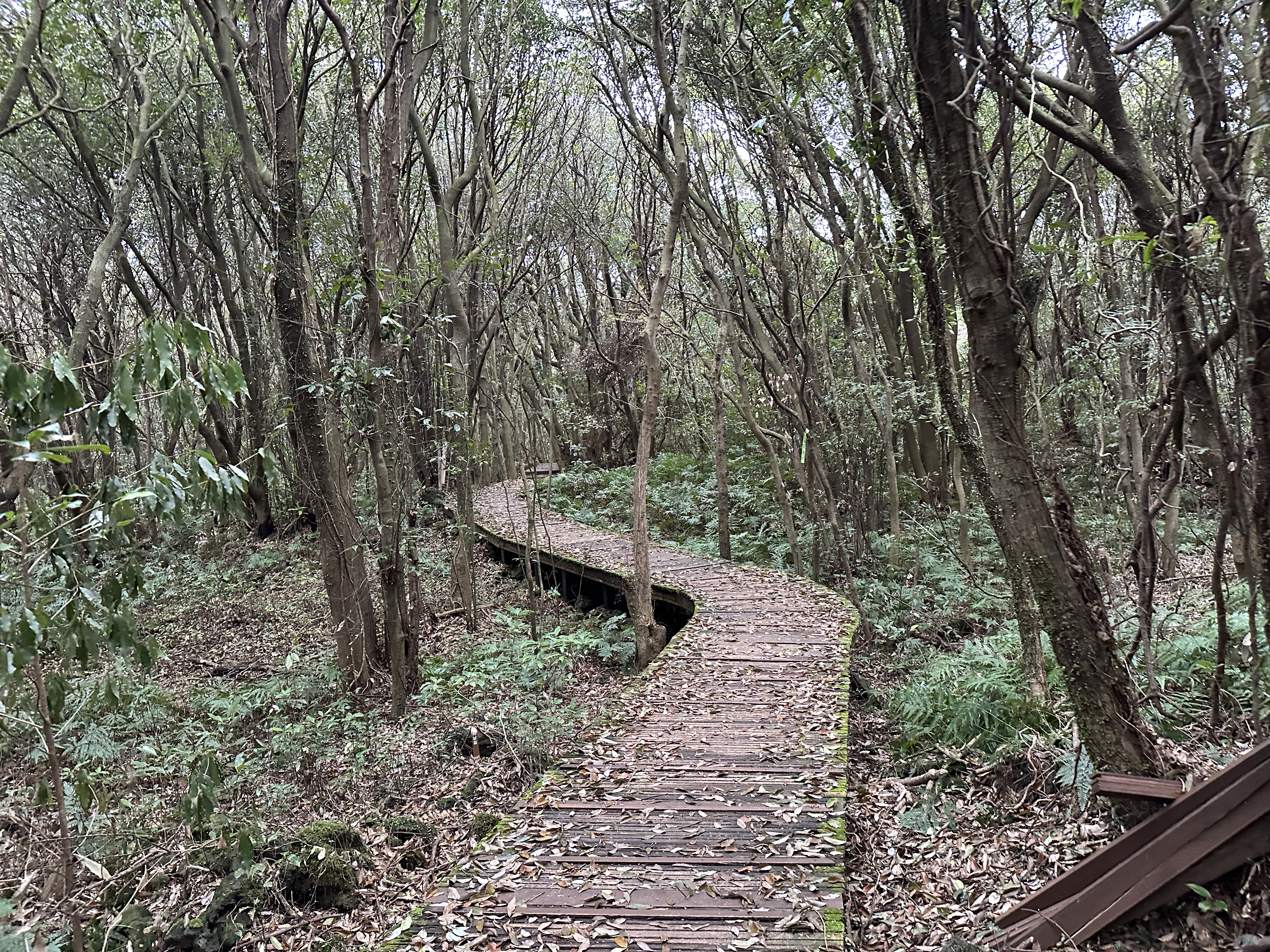
- Interior of the park (2026)
- Interactive map of Jeju Gotjawal Provincial Park
- Coordinates: 33.2888°N 126.2649°E
- Website: www.jejugotjawal.or.kr

Korean name
- Hangul: 제주곶자왈도립공원
- Hanja: 濟州곶자왈道立公園
- RR: Jeju gotjawal dorip gongwon
- MR: Cheju kotchawal torip kongwŏn

Jeju Gotjawal Provincial Park (Korean: 제주곶자왈도립공원) is a public park that contains a large area of gotjawal (Jeju–language term for the local forest biome). It is located in Daejeong-eup, Seogwipo, South Korea. The park was first established in 2015.

The park has several hiking trails through the forest. One can choose which trails to follow to determine the length of the overall hike. The shortest recommended course (#1) is 1.8 km in length; it goes from the entrance of the park to the observation tower. The longest course, which includes a long linear path to the east, is 6.7 km long.

Work began on building the park in 2009. Phase 1 of the project lasted from 2009 to 2012 and resulted in the creation of hiking trails and rest areas. Phase 2 of construction lasted from 2013 to 2015 and resulted in the creation of a visitor information center, observation tower, and visitor education facility. The park was partially opened to the public before it was fully completed. The park was fully opened to the public in July 2015.

== Gallery ==
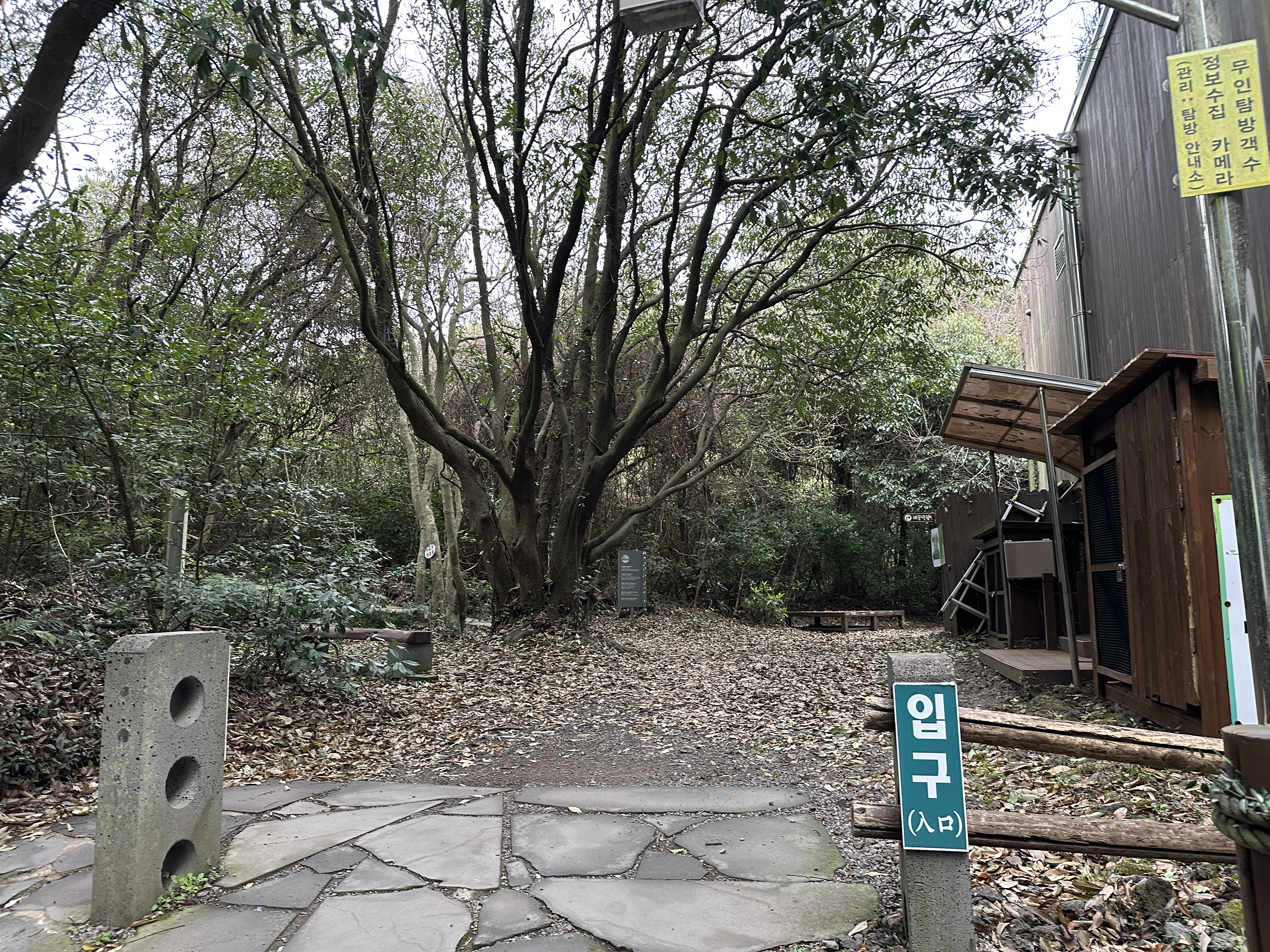
Park entrance (2026)

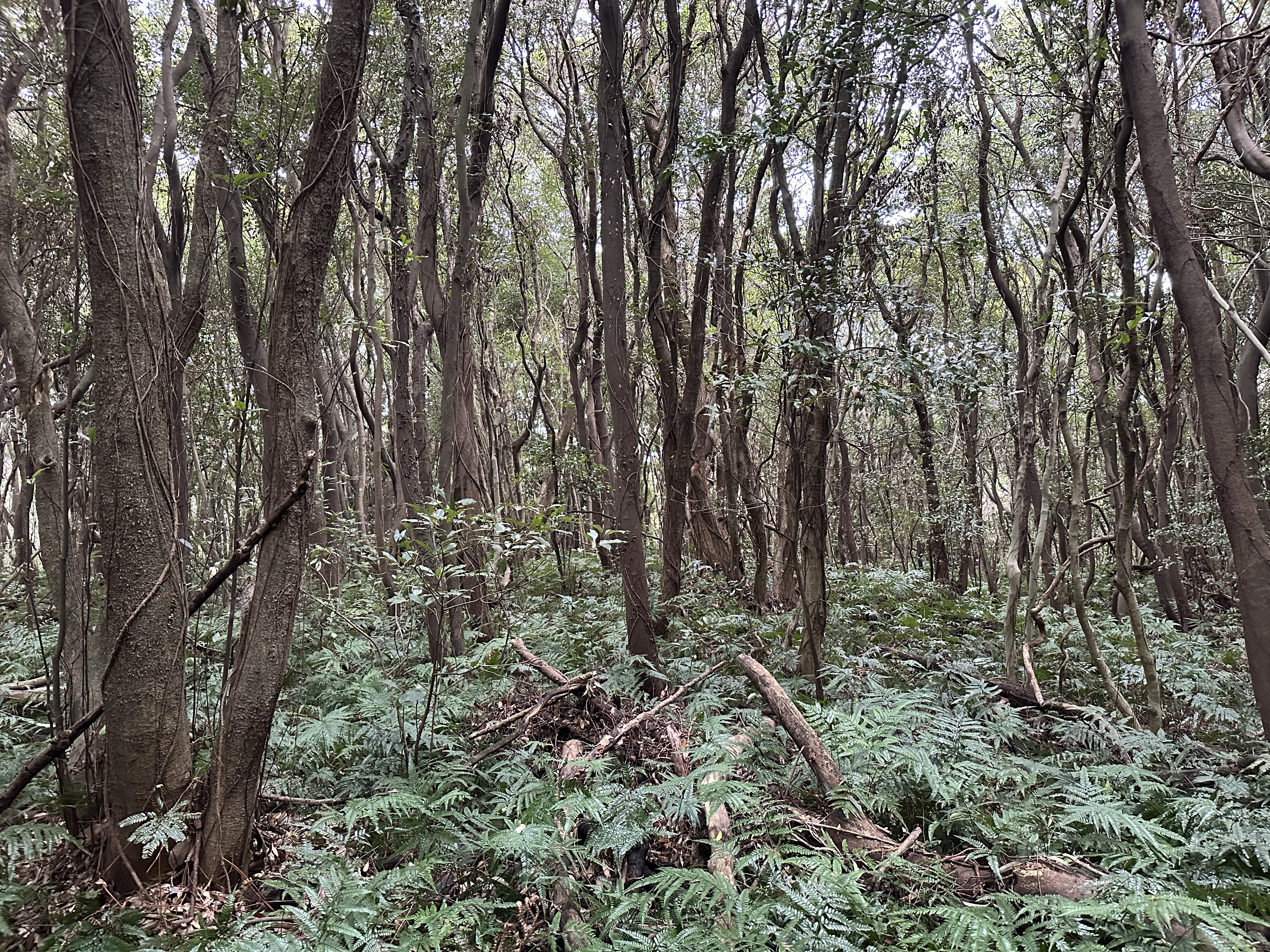
Gotjawal scenery (2026)

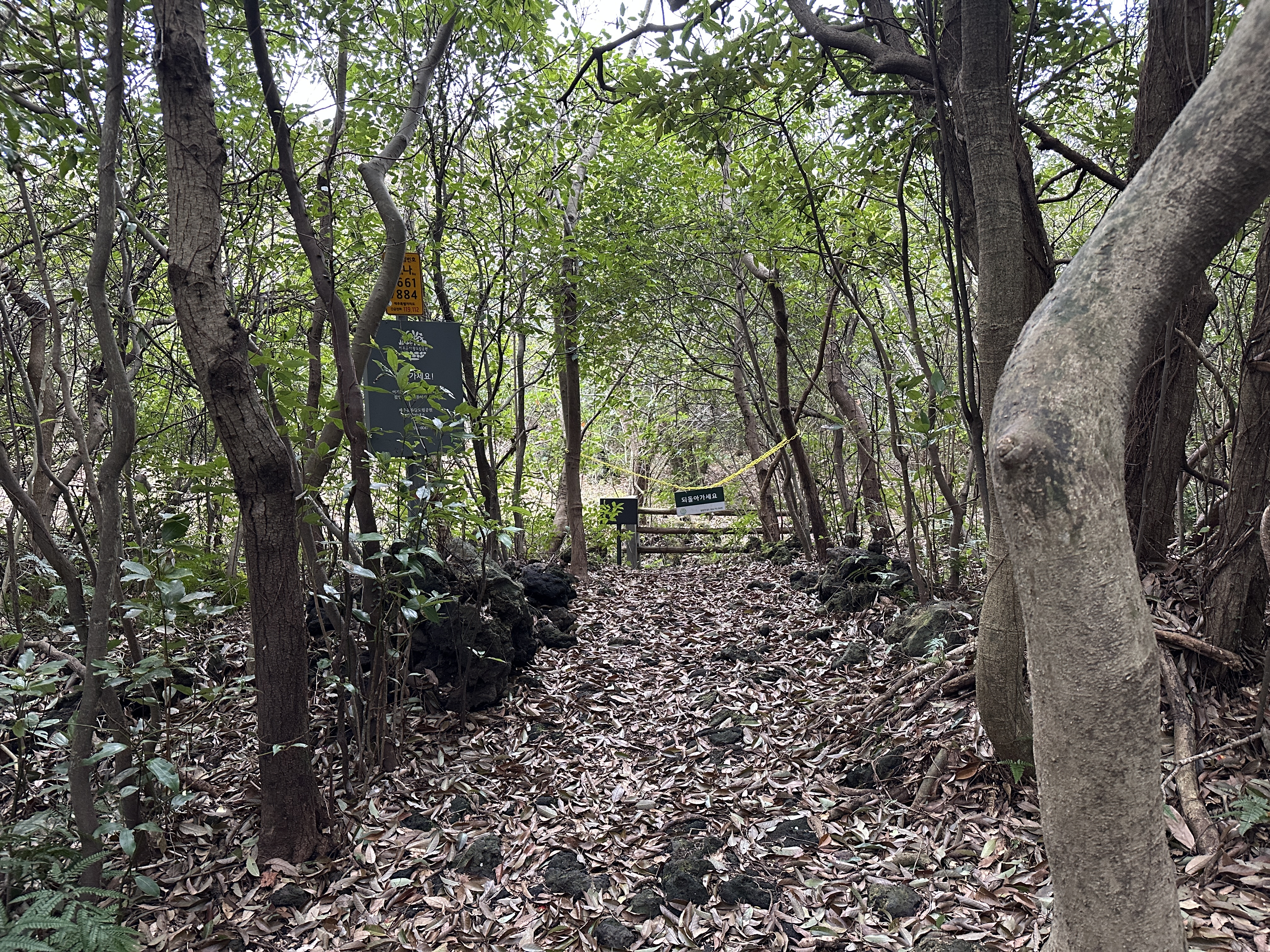
End of the eastern linear path (2026)
