= Utteureu =

Jeju-language term for "upper area"

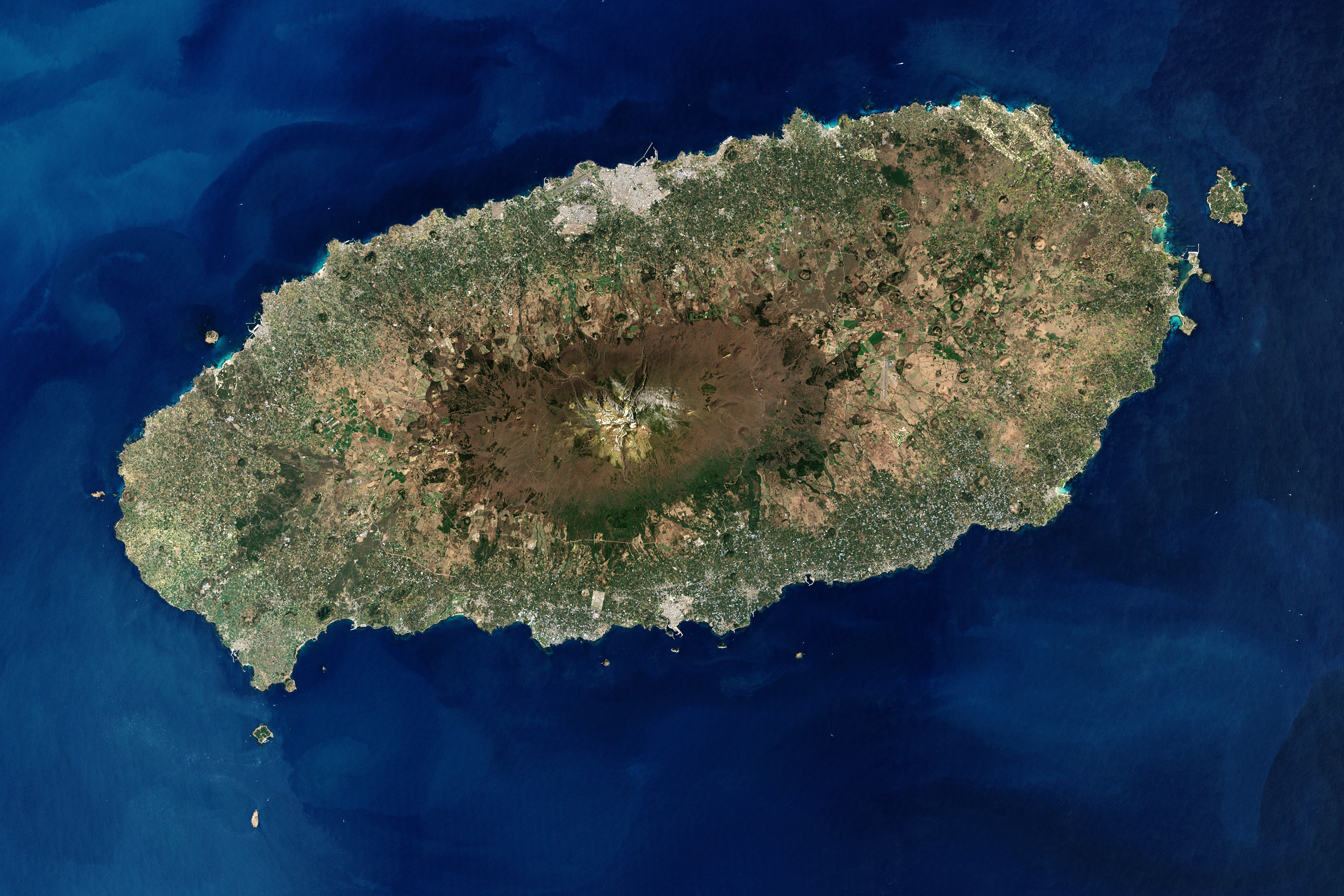
- Jeju Island. Much of the elevated areas between the coasts and the central mountain Hallasan are utteureu.

Korean name
- Hangul: 웃뜨르; 웃드르
- RR: uttteureu; utdeureu
- MR: uttŭrŭ; uttŭrŭ

Utteureu (Korean: 웃뜨르), also spelled utdeureu (웃드르) and utdeuri (웃드리), is a Jeju-language term meaning "upper area". It refers to inland portions of Jeju Island, which has a large central mountain Hallasan.

Until the late 20th century, the term often had a negative connotation, and was even used as or in slurs. The inland regions of Jeju were difficult to traverse, had poor access to water, and were poorly suited for agriculture. People there were thought to be impoverished outcasts. During the Jeju uprising of the late 1940s, people from the coasts hid in the secluded utteureu regions from government forces. The economic conditions of the area drastically changed beginning around the 1960s, when plumbing and modern transport infrastructure greatly expanded there.

In 2008, several divisions of Hangyeong-myeon on the west side of Jeju, which were once considered utteureu, launched a campaign under a shared brand of utteureu to attract tourism and modernize. They attempted to embrace and reframe the term as evoking a calm country lifestyle. Since then, many programs and tourist attractions in the area have used the term as such.

== See also ==
- History of Jeju Province
- Gotjawal – forests that were once widespread in utteureu
