= Miaksan =

Mountain in Jeju Province, South Korea

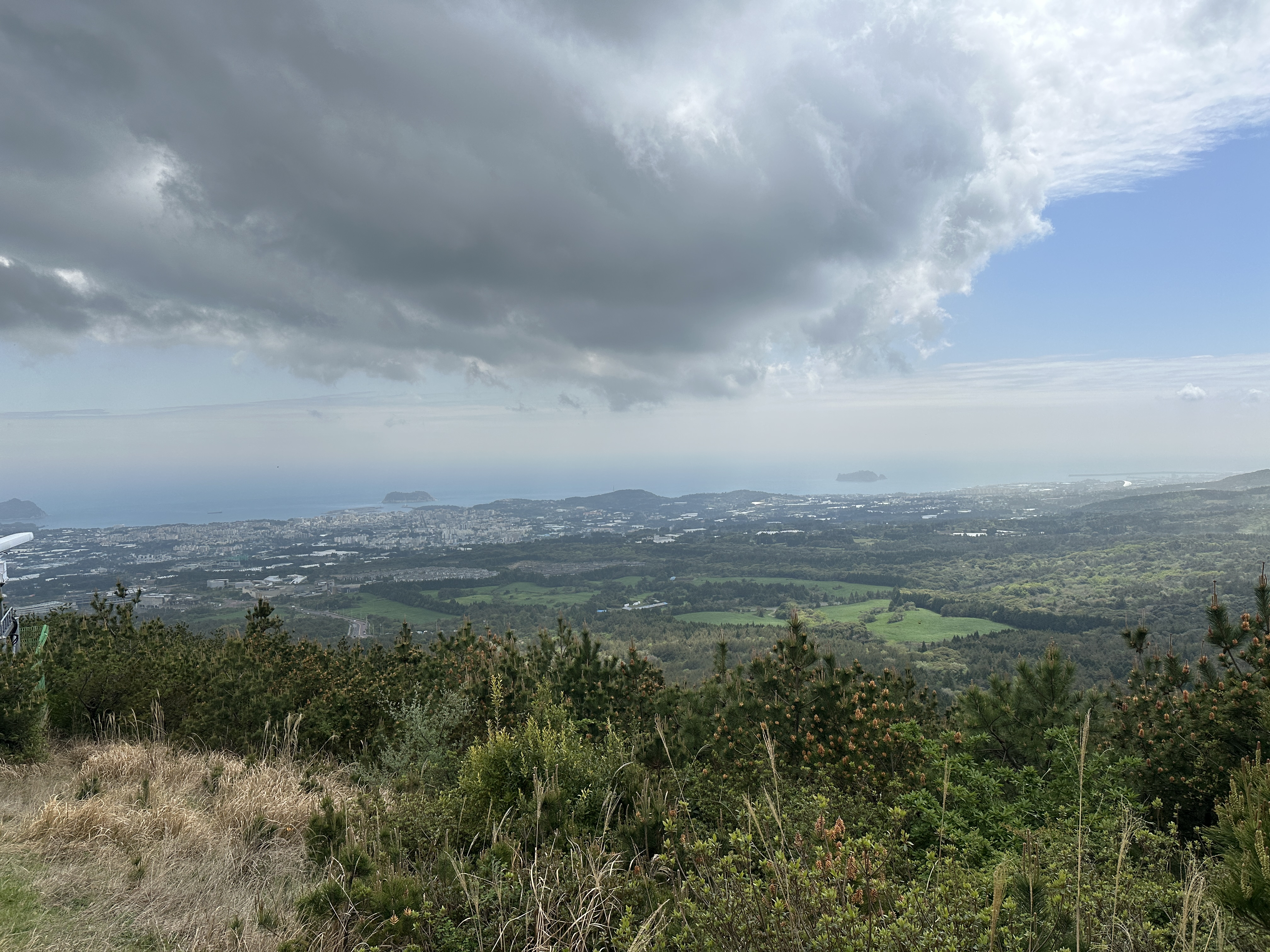
- View from the summit (2026)

Highest point
- Coordinates: 33.3005°N 126.5544°E

Geography

Korean name
- Hangul: 미악산
- Hanja: 米岳山; 尾岳山
- RR: Miaksan
- MR: Miaksan

Alternate name
- Hangul: 솔오름
- RR: Sororeum
- MR: Sororŭm

Miaksan (Korean: 미악산), also called Sol Oreum or Soloreum (솔오름; in Jeju language ᄉᆞᆯ오름), is an oreum (small extinct volcano) in Seogwipo, Jeju Province, South Korea.

It has an elevation of 567.5m, but its height relative to its surroundings is 113m. The mountain has a hiking trail on it that leads to the top. A paved road also exists that goes to the summit. In 2008, an article claimed that the mountain was popular for hang gliding.

== Gallery ==
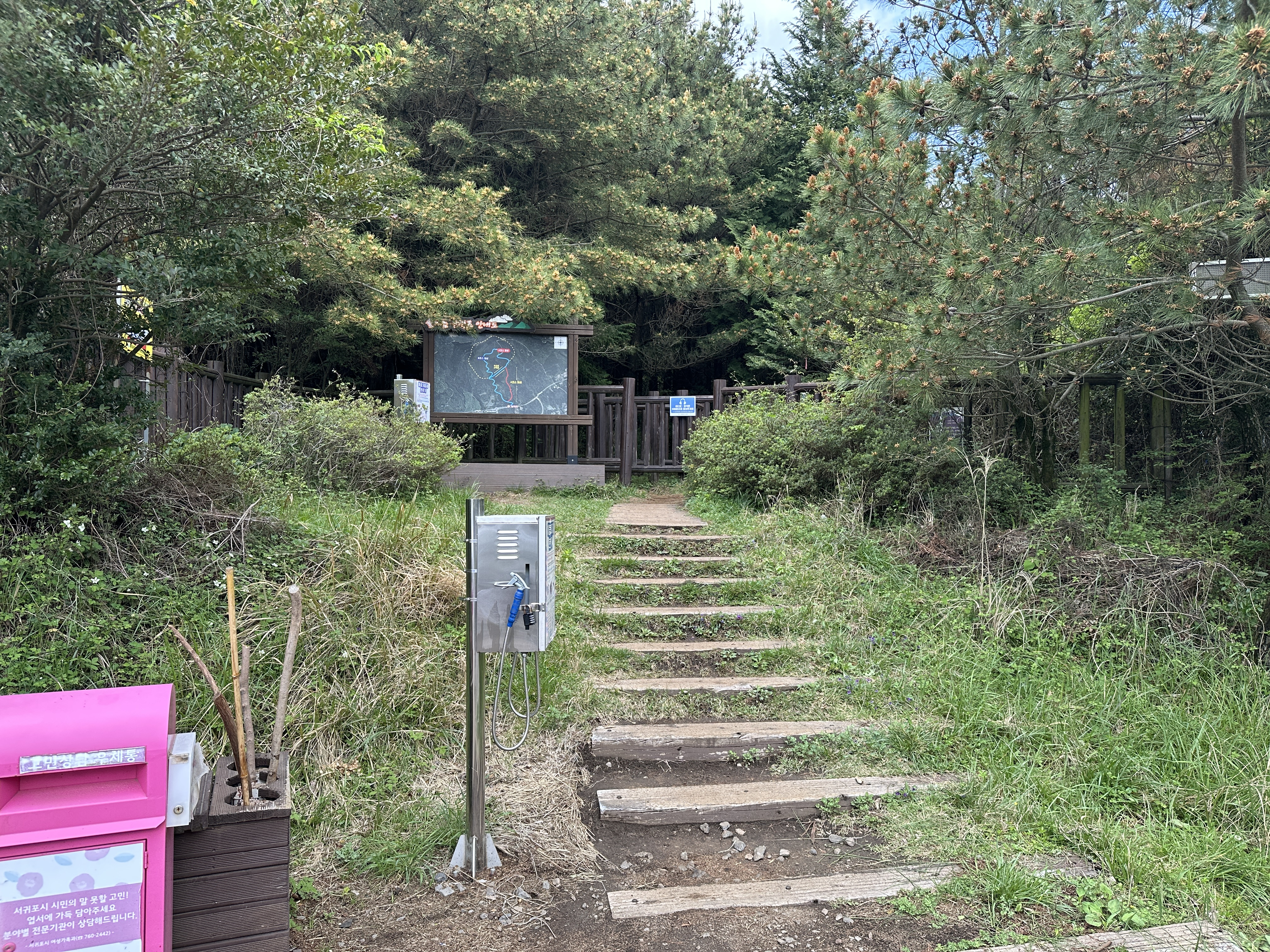
Entrance to the hiking trail (2026)

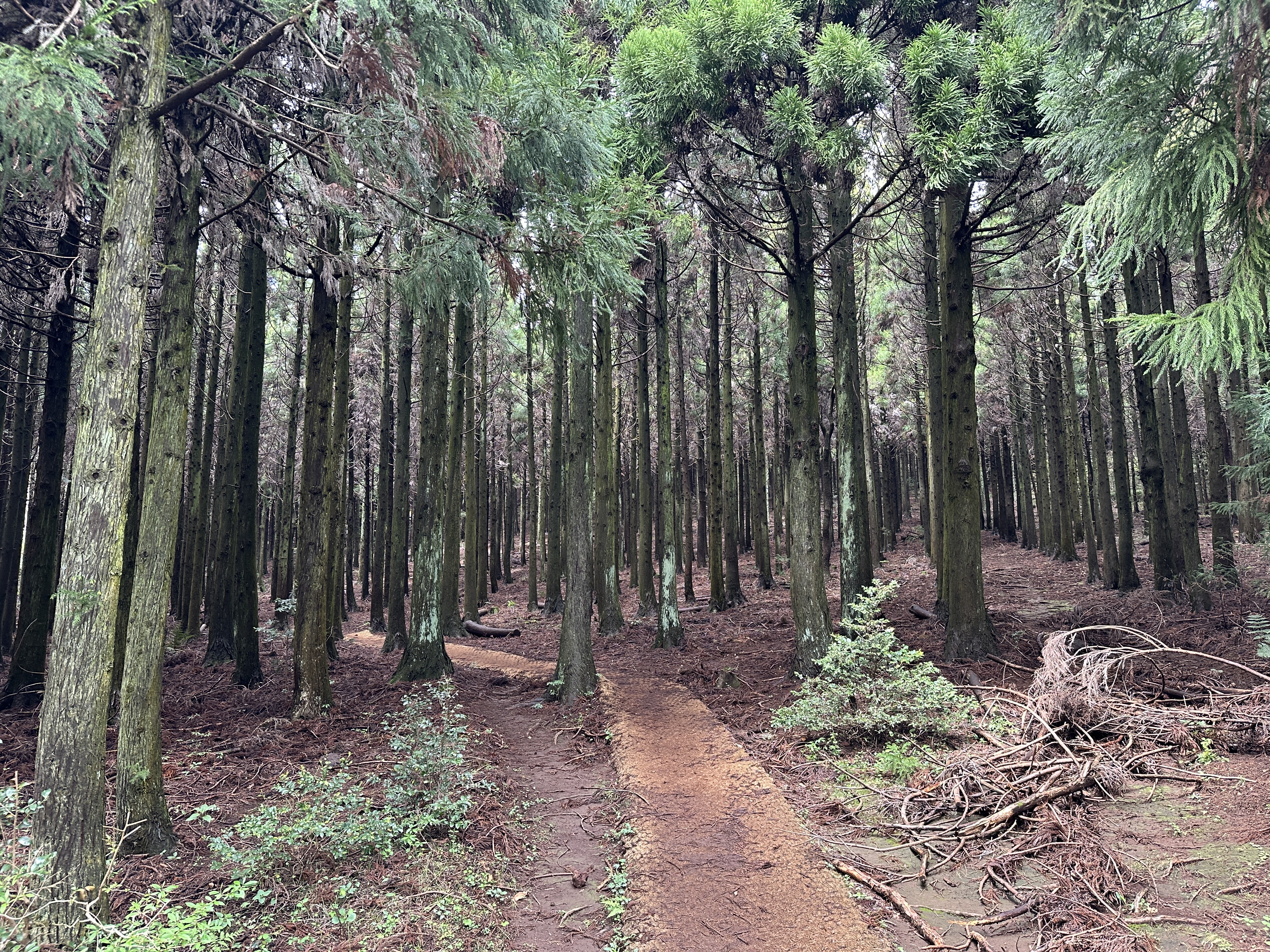
Hiking trail (2026)

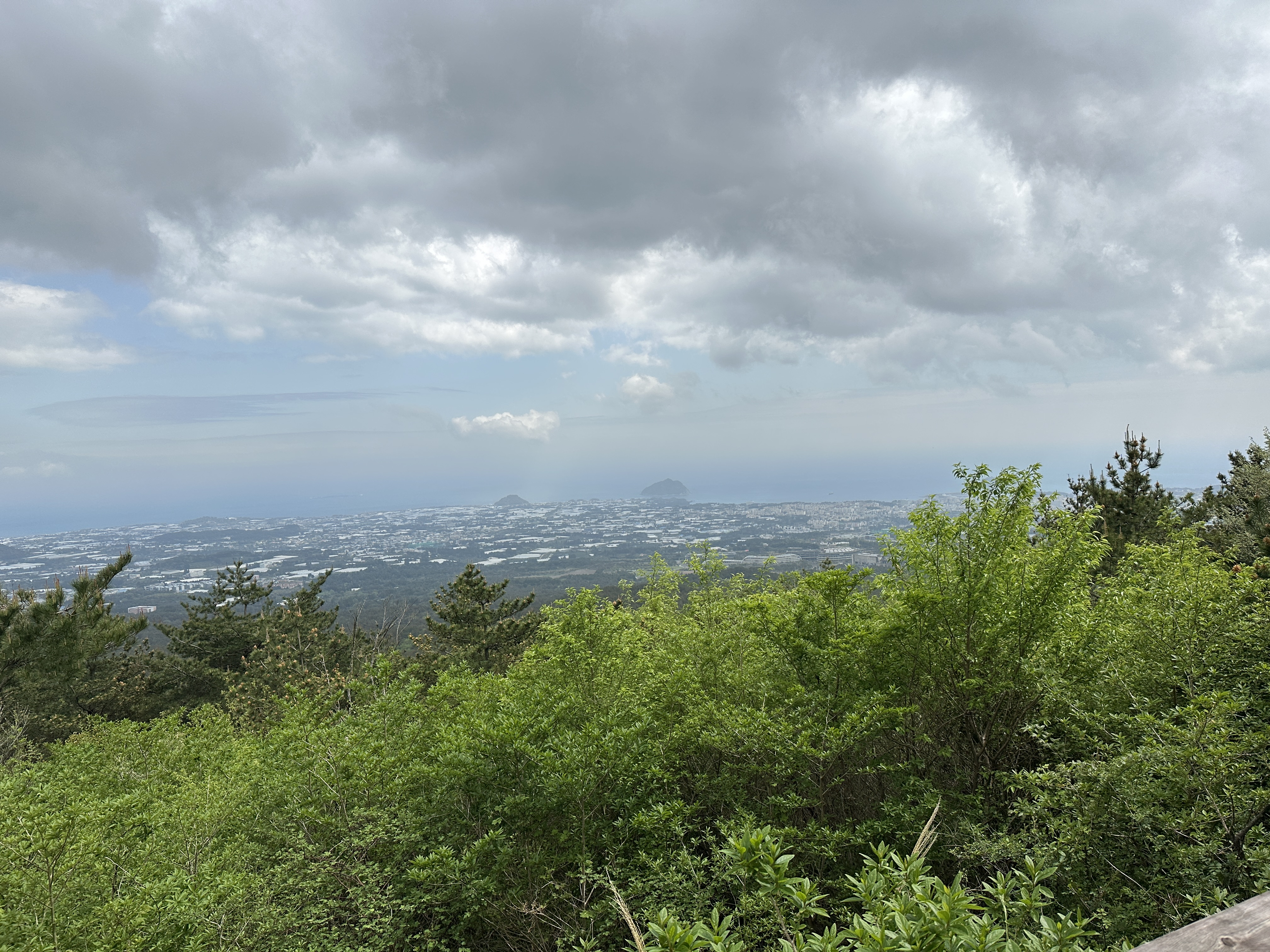
View south (2026)

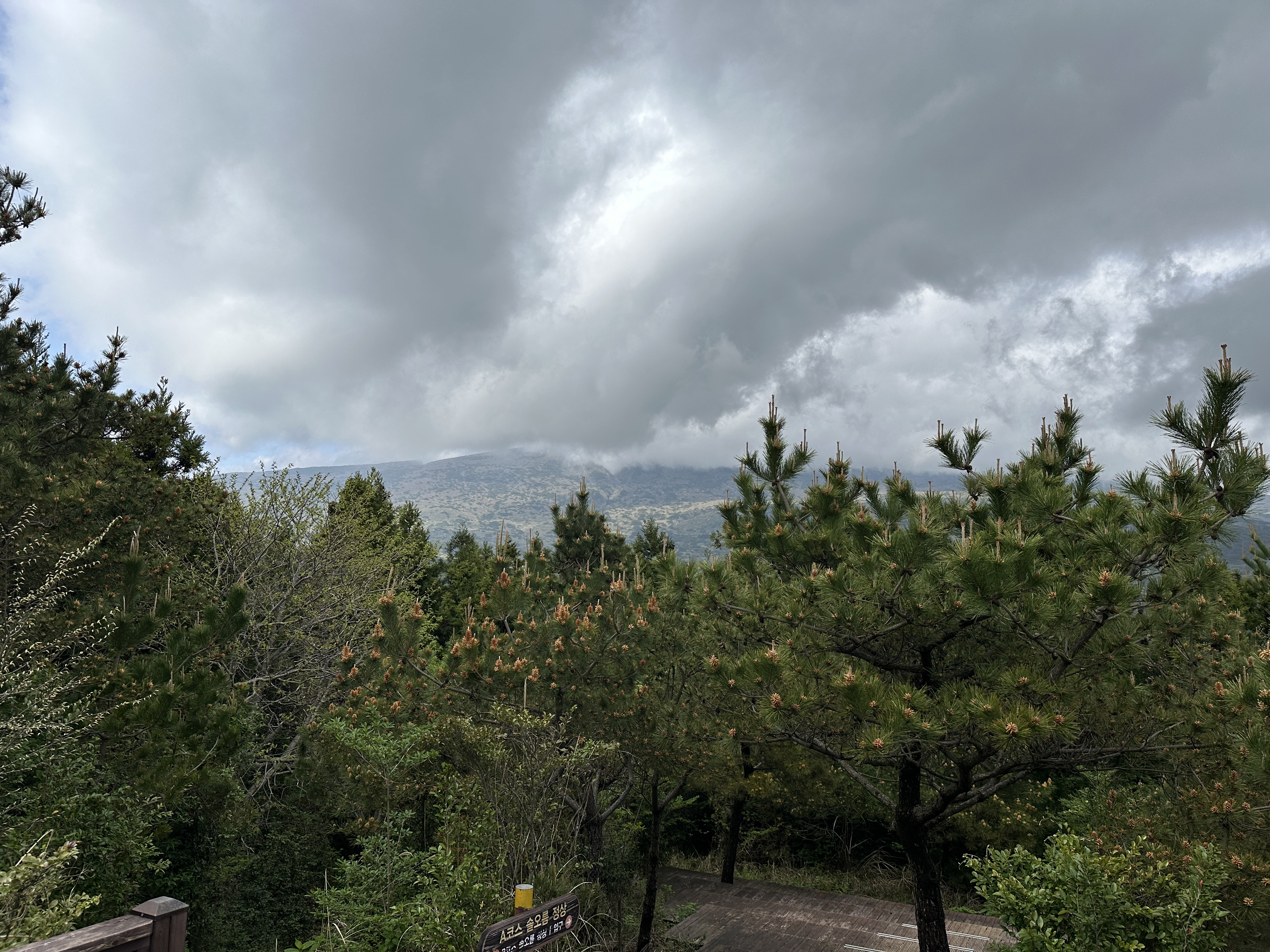
View north, towards Hallasan (2026)
