= Gotjawal =

Jeju-language term for forests on Jeju, South Korea

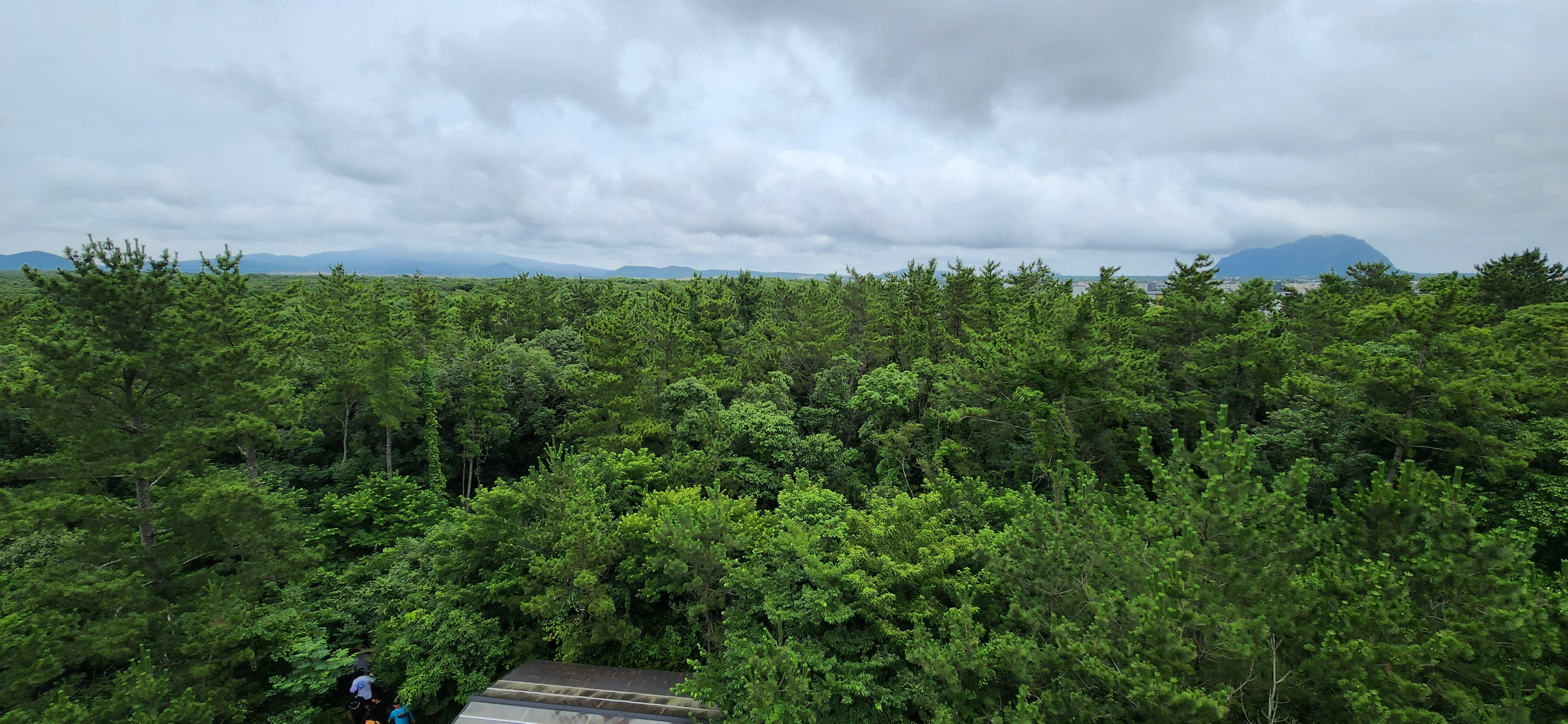
- View of a gotjawal

Korean name
- Hangul: 곶자왈
- RR: gotjawal
- MR: kotchawal

Gotjawal (Jeju: 곶자왈) is a Jeju-language term for a dense and wild forest. The term is now used to describe the forest biome of Jeju Island, in Jeju Province, South Korea.

Gotjawal are typically found between the island's central mountain Hallasan and the coasts.

== Etymology ==
Gotjawal is a Jeju language term. Got refers to forests, and jawal refers to a place with shallow, gravely soil (see also 자갈; jagal).

== Distribution ==
There are considered to be four main gotjawal regions on the island. In order from west to east, they are the Hangyeong–Andeok Gotjawal (한경-안덕 곶자왈), Aewol Gotjawal (애월 곶자왈), Jocheon–Hamdeok Gotjawal (조천–함덕 곶자왈), and the Gujwa–Seongsan Gotjawal (구좌-성산 곶자왈). Each of these regions are further divided into several parks and individual named gotjawal. For example, the Jeju Gotjawal Provincial Park. These regions are mostly between Hallasan and the western, northern, and eastern coasts of the island, and located at around 200 to 400 m (660 to 1,310 ft) above sea level.

A 2015 news article gave the total area of gotjawal to be 9,256 ha (22,870 acres), which accounted for 5.0% of the total land area of Jeju.

== Description ==
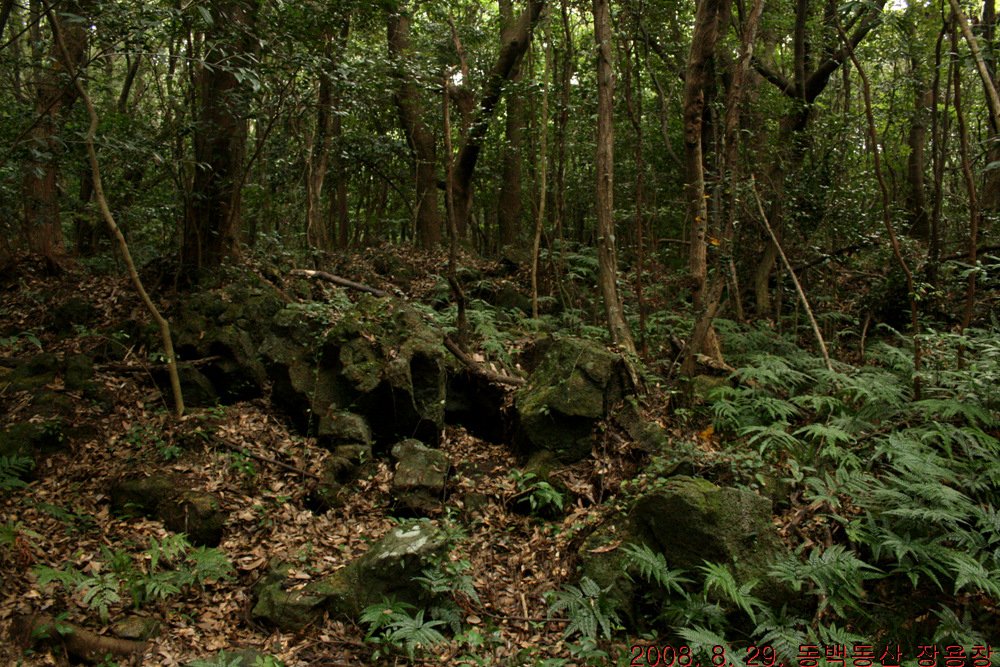
A gotjawal

Gotjawal play a number of roles in the island's climate and ecosystem. They play a significant role in recharging the aquifer. 46% of the rainwater that the gotjawal areas receive permeates through the lava and soil into the groundwater's aquifers, via lava structures such as lava tubes, skylights, clinkers, and cracks. They also create a warm and humid environment that hosts plants that do not thrive elsewhere on the island. They also provide vegetation and cover from rain for local animals.

The forests occupy ʻaʻā lava flow terrain. Song suggests that the forests occupy a mix of such terrain and pahoehoe lava terrain. They are discontinuous and scattered around various parts of the island.

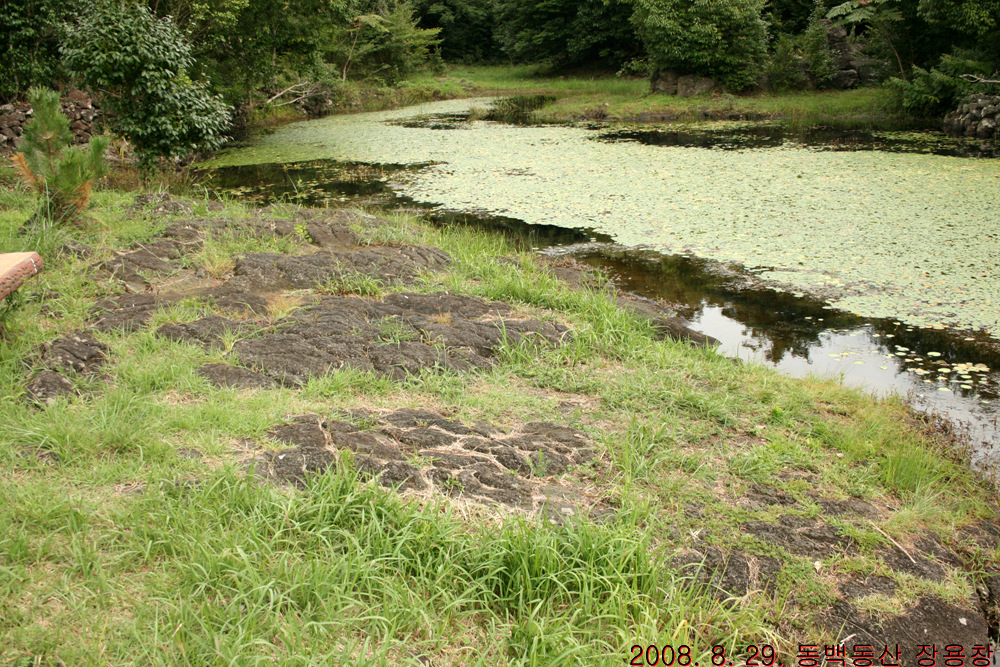
Gotjawal Forest pond

The areas are considered to have poor quality soil, and are poorly suited for agriculture or grazing. The forests developed over long periods of time and are considered to be slow to regenerate.

== Flora ==
The flora in each gotjawal differs. In general, they tend to be diverse and densely packed. There are a wide variety of ferns in gotjawal, some of which are not found elsewhere in Korea. Plants such as Chinese hackberry, bamboo, camellia, chrysanthemum, and pine trees can be found.

== Protection ==
Locals once considered gotjawal to be barren and useless in the past. Especially by the 1970s, significant logging and clearing of gotjawal occurred. A 2015 article reported that 38.2% of the gotjawal on Jeju had been cleared in order to create golf courses or tourist sites. Other significant tracts of gotjawal were cleared for such developments as the Jeju Myths and History Theme Park and the Jeju Global Education City. The clearings, especially those for golf courses, have been met by criticism from environmentalists.

Sentiment has since shifted to seeing the gotjawal as valuable, and efforts have been made to preserve them for their unique environment and impact on the island's groundwater. They have been positively metaphorically described as the "lungs of Jeju" (제주의 허파), "nature's lungs" (자연의 허파), and "the lifeline of Jeju's ecosystem" (제주 생태계의 생명선). Some have advocated for turning the gotjawal areas into protected national or provincial parks.

There are also efforts to increase awareness of gotjawal by making them more attractive tourist destinations. This has been met with concerns that such curation of the forests could cause damage to them.

== See also ==
- Jeju Gotjawal Provincial Park
- Forest ecology
- Ramsar Classification System for Wetland Types

== Additional reading ==
- Han, Sang-cheol, 2002, (in Korean) Study on the grouting method of construction of Jeju island groundwater, Cheju National University.
- Jang, Yong-chang and Chanwon Lee, 2009, Gotjawal Forest as an internationally important Wetlant, Journal of Korean Wetlands Studies, Vol 11-1, April 2009, pp. 99–104
- Jeong, Gwang-jung, 2004, Gotjawal and the livelihood of Jeju's People, 2004, Jeju Educational College, V. 33, pp. 41~65.
