= Noun particle =

Linguistic feature

A noun particle is any morpheme that denotes or marks the presence of a noun. They are a common feature of languages such as Japanese and Korean.

== Korean particles ==
Korean noun particles are postpositional, following the word they mark, as opposed to prepositions which precedes the marked word.

Korean noun particles include the subject particle i/ga (이/가), the object-marking particle eul/reul (을/를), and the topic-marking particle eun/neun (은/는), all of which show allomorphy.

== Japanese particles ==
Like Korean, Japanese noun particles follow the noun being marked, and can serve any of several functions in a given sentence.

昨日 スーパー へ 行きました。
Kinō sūpā e ikimashita.
Yesterday, I went to the supermarket.

In this example, "e" is the noun particle for "sūpā" ("supermarket"). This particular noun particle denotes direction towards a place, being "supermarket."

昼ごはん は 私 が ピザ を 食べた。
Hirugohan wa watashi ga piza o tabeta.
I ate pizza for lunch. lit. As for lunch, I ate pizza.

The three noun particles ("wa," "ga," and "o") all serve different functions:

- "wa" - topic marker ("hirugohan" - lunch)
- "ga" - subject marker ("watashi" - I)
- "o" - object marker ("piza" - pizza)
