= Jeju language =

Koreanic language of Jeju Province, South Korea

Jeju
- Jejueo, Jejuan
- 제줏말 / 제주말; Jejunmal / Jejumal
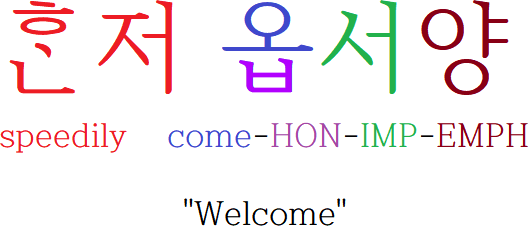
- Native to: South Korea (Jeju Province)
- Region: Jeju Province
- Ethnicity: Jejuans
- Native speakers: 5,000 (2014)
- Language family: Koreanic: Jeju
- Early forms: Proto-Koreanic: Old Korean; Middle Korean
- Writing system: Hangul

Language codes
- ISO 639-3: jje
- Glottolog: jeju1234
- ELP: Jejueo

Jeju (Jeju: 제줏말; Jeju RR: Jejunmal, or Korean: 제주어; RR: Jejueo, or 제주말; Jejumal), often called Jejueo or Jejuan in English-language scholarship, is a Koreanic language originally from Jeju Province, South Korea. It is not entirely mutually intelligible with mainland Korean dialects. While it was historically considered a divergent Jeju dialect of the Korean language, it is increasingly referred to as a separate language in its own right. It is declining in usage and was classified by UNESCO in 2010 as critically endangered, the highest level of language endangerment possible. Revitalization efforts are ongoing.

The consonants of Jeju are similar to those of the Seoul dialect of Korean, but Jeju has a larger and more conservative vowel inventory. Jeju is a head-final, agglutinative, suffixing language, like Korean. Nouns are followed by particles that may function as case markers. Verbs inflect for tense, aspect, mood, evidentiality, relative social status, formality, and other grammatical information. Korean and Jeju differ significantly in their verbal paradigms. For instance, the continuative aspect marker of Jeju and the mood or aspect distinction of many Jeju connective suffixes are absent in Korean. Most of the Jeju lexicon is Koreanic, and the language preserves many Middle Korean features and words now lost in Standard Korean. Jeju may also have a Peninsular Japonic substratum, but this argument has been disputed.

Jeju was already divergent from Seoul Korean by the fifteenth century and unintelligible to mainland Korean visitors by the sixteenth century. The language was severely undermined by the aftermath of the Jeju uprising of 1948, the Korean War, and the modernization of South Korea. Many fluent speakers remaining in Jeju Island are now over seventy years old. Most people in Jeju Island now speak a variety of Korean with a Jeju substratum. The language may be somewhat more vigorous in a diaspora community in Osaka, Japan, as many Jeju people migrated to Osaka in the 1920s, but even there, younger members of the community tend to speak Japanese.

== Nomenclature and relationship to Korean ==
1995-1999	48
2000-2004	51
2005-2009	51
2010-2014	55

Total: 205

Jeju language

Jeju dialect

Nomenclature of Jeju in the titles of South Korean academic publications

Various terms in both Korean and English exist for the Jeju language, which also vary depending on whether it is considered a separate language or a dialect of Korean by the speaker.

Among native speakers, the term "Jeju speech" (제주말; Jejumal) is most commonly used. In English-language scholarship, it is often called Jejueo or Jejuan.

=== Language or dialect distinction ===
Jeju is closely related to Korean. It was traditionally considered an especially divergent dialect of Korean, and as of 2019 is still referred to as such by the National Institute of Korean Language and the South Korean Ministry of Education.

Until the 2000s, South Korean academia preferred the term "Jeju dialect" (제주방언; Jeju bangeon). While the term "Jeju language" (제주어; Jejueo) was first used in 1947, it was not until the mid-1990s that the term gained traction. The majority of South Korean academic publications switched to using "Jeju language" by the early 2010s. Since somewhat earlier, "Jeju language" has also been the term preferred in local law, such as the 2007 Language Act for the Preservation and Promotion of the Jeju Language, (Note: 제주어 보전 및 육성 조례; Jeju-eo bojeon mit yukseong jorye) and by non-governmental organizations working to preserve the language. The only English-language monograph on Jeju, published in 2019, consistently refers to it as a language as well.

==== Mutual intelligibility with modern South Korean Korean ====
Jeju is not mutually intelligible with even the southernmost dialects of South Korea. In a 2014 survey measuring intelligibility, Korean speakers from three different dialect zones (Seoul, Busan, and Yeosu) were exposed to one minute of spoken Jeju, with a control group of native Jeju speakers. On average, South Korean native speakers from all three dialect zones answered less than 10% of the basic comprehension questions correctly, while native Jeju speakers answered over 89% of the questions correctly. These results are comparable to the results of an intelligibility test of Norwegian for native Dutch speakers. Diaspora Jeju speakers living in Japan have also reported that they find it difficult to understand South Korean news media, and resort to Japanese subtitles when watching South Korean TV shows.

== Geographic distribution ==
Jeju was traditionally spoken throughout Jeju Province except in the Chuja Islands, halfway between Jeju Island and mainland Korea, where a variety of Southwestern Korean is found. The language is also used by some of the first- and second-generation (Note: The term "first and second generations" as used here refers to Jeju speakers born in Jeju, though now living in Japan (the first generation), and to their children who were born in Japan (the second generation).) members of the Zainichi Korean community in Ikuno-ku, Osaka, Japan.

Compared to mainland Korean dialect groups, there is little internal variation within Jeju. A distinction between a northern and southern dialect with a geographic divide at Hallasan is sometimes posited, but an eastern-western dialectal divide cutting through Jeju City and Seogwipo may better explain the few dialectal differences that do exist. A 2010 survey of regional variation in 305 word sets suggests that the north–south divide and the east–west divide coexist, resulting in four distinct dialect groups.

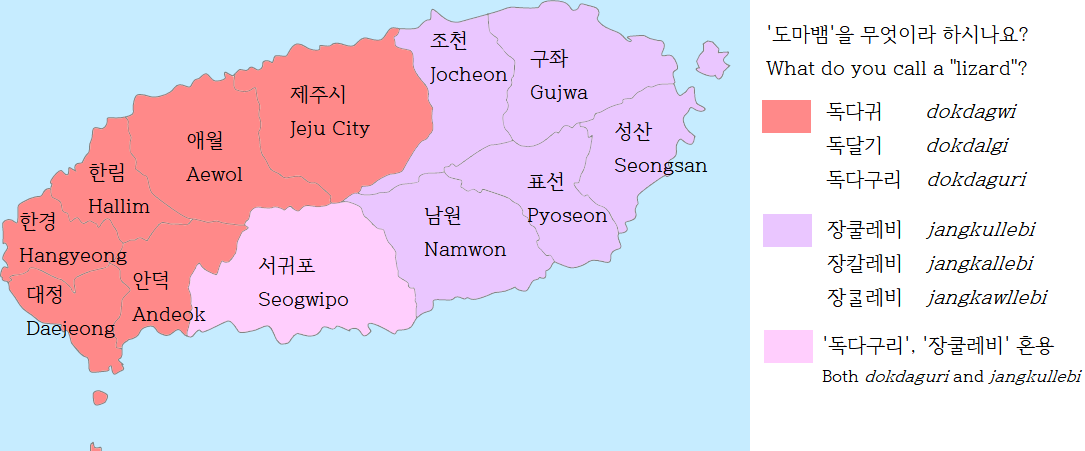
An east–west divide is salient in the Jeju words for "lizard".
Eastern Seogwipo uses 장쿨레비 jangkullebi while western Seogwipo uses 독다구리 dokdaguri.

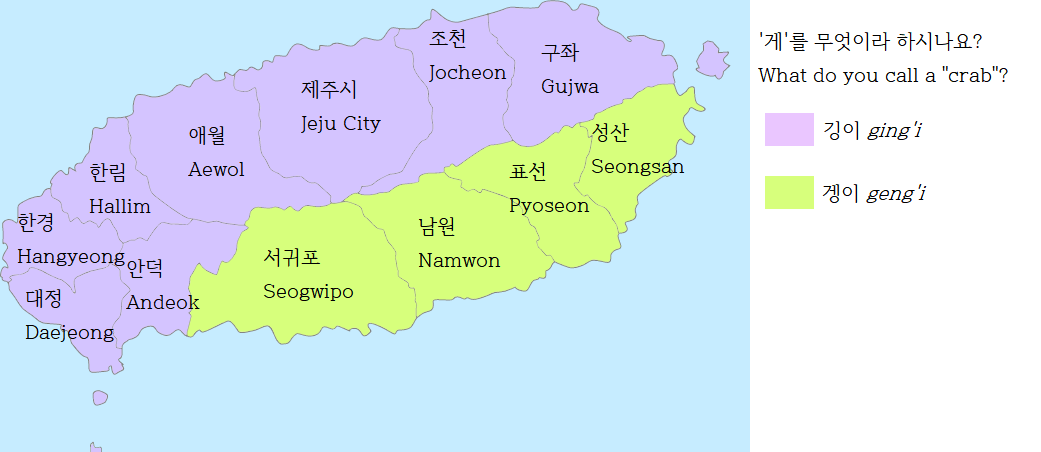
A north–south divide is more noticeable in the Jeju words for "crab".

== History ==
=== Pre-modern history ===
The Koreanic languages are likely not native to Jeju Island; it has been proposed that the family has its roots in Manchuria, a historical region in northeastern Asia. It is thought that Koreanic speakers migrated from southern Manchuria between the third and eighth centuries CE. Linguist Alexander Vovin suggests that the ancient kingdom of Tamna, which ruled the island until the twelfth century, may have spoken a Japonic language that left a substrate influence on Jeju. When exactly this putative Japonic language may have been replaced by the Koreanic ancestor of Jeju remains unclear.

During the late thirteenth century, Jeju Island came under direct Yuan administration, which lead to significant migration of Mongol soldiers to the island. Acting as a superstratum, their language contributed to the change of the local language. Yang Changyong, a linguist, speculates that Mongol influence played a significant role in the formation of Jejueo as a distinct language independent from standard Korean.

By the fifteenth century, when the invention of Hangul greatly improved the understanding of Korean phonology, Seoul Korean and Jeju were already divergent; the Seoul prestige dialect of fifteenth-century Middle Korean disallowed the diphthong /jʌ/, which Jeju allows. Sixteenth- and seventeenth-century references to the language of Jeju by mainland Korean literati state that it was already unintelligible to mainland Koreans. Kim Sanghŏn (1570–1652), who from 1601 to 1602 served as the island's pacification commissioner, (Note: 안무어사; anmueosa) gives six words in the "provincial language" with clear cognates in modern Jeju and also writes:

謫人 申長齡 乃譯官也 嘗曰 「比島語音 酷以中華 如驅牛馬之聲 尤不可分辯云云 盖風氣與華不隔而然耶 曾爲元朝所據置官於此故與華相雜而然耶」... 所謂俚語者 但高細不可曉

"The exiled man Shin Jangnyeong was originally a government interpreter. He said, 'The language of this island is most like Chinese, and the sounds they make while driving cattle and horses are yet more impossible to tell apart. Is this because the climate is not far from that of China, or because the Yuan dynasty once ruled and appointed officials here and the Chinese mingled with them?'... What is called the provincial language is but high and thin and cannot be understood."

In 1629, the Korean government banned the emigration of Jeju Islanders to the mainland, further restricting linguistic contacts between Jeju and Korean. At the same time, the island was also used throughout the Joseon era (1392–1910) as a place of exile for disgraced scholar-officials. These highly educated speakers of Seoul Korean often tutored the children of their Jeju neighbors during their exile and established a continuous and significant Seoul Korean superstratum in Jeju.

=== Japanese colonial period (1910–1945) ===
Under the Japanese colonial rule, Jejueo remained the dominating language in both public and private spheres on Jeju Island. However, with the entrance of Japanese loanwords to the lexicon, some speakers became monolingual Japanese speakers. Migration of Jeju Islanders to Japan began to skyrocket in 1911, with significant communities established, more so in cities like Osaka, becoming home to 38,000 Jeju Islanders by 1911. Despite gaining independence, citizens of Jeju and Korea still migrated to Japan, continuing to impact the linguistic landscape of Jeju Island as the younger generations within the diaspora communities only spoke Japanese, leading the decline in fluency in Jejueo.

=== Modern period and decline (1945–present) ===
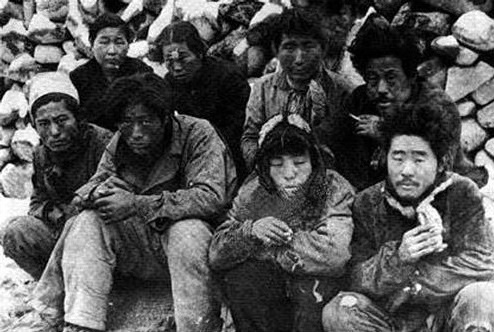
Jeju inhabitants awaiting execution in late 1948

Severe disruption to the Jeju language community began after the end of Japanese rule and World War II in 1945. Korea was divided between an American-backed government in the South and a Soviet-backed government in the north, which were succeeded by South Korea and North Korea correspondingly in 1948. Popular opposition to the division and many other issues led to a rebellion on Jeju island on 3 April 1948. The Syngman Rhee regime suppressed the rebellion with mass killings of civilians. As many as 60,000 Jeju Islanders, or a full fifth of the pre-rebellion population, were killed. 40,000 more fled to Japan. Out of the 400 villages of the island, only 170 remained.

The devastating impact of the massacres on the Jeju language community was exacerbated by the outbreak of the Korean War in 1950. While Jeju was never occupied by the North Korean army, nearly 150,000 Korean-speaking refugees from the mainland fleeing North Korean invasion arrived in Jeju in the first year of the war.

The above events shattered the Jeju language's former dominance on the island, and Standard Korean began to displace Jeju in the public sphere by the 1950s. The 1970s Saemaeul Undong, an ambitious rural modernization program launched by Park Chung Hee, disrupted the traditional village community where Jeju had thrived. The language came to be perceived as an incorrect dialect of Korean; students were even subject to corporal punishment if they used it in school. Standard Korean became more commonplace in private settings even outside of Jeju City. The language attitude of native Jeju speakers in this period was self-disparaging, and even Jeju people regarded the use of Jeju "with contempt". A 1981 survey of language attitudes among high school and university students natively speaking Seoul Korean, Chungcheong Korean, Southwestern Korean, Southeastern Korean, and Jeju showed that Jeju speakers were the most likely among the five groups to ascribe negative traits to their native variety.

A 1992 study of code-switching by native Jeju speakers shows that Jeju was by then in an unfavorable diglossic relationship with Korean, and was largely restricted to informal contexts even between Jeju natives. Within a primarily Jeju conversation, Standard Korean was used to emphasize the rationality or truth value of statements. Switching to Jeju in a primarily Standard Korean conversation signified that the speaker was making a subjective statement or being less serious.

Code-switching rules in early 1990s Jeju
Participants	Formality	Intimacy	Social status	Preferred variety
Includes mainlander				Standard Korean
Only Jeju natives	Formal			Standard Korean
Only Jeju natives	Informal	Participants are not emotionally intimate	Speaker is socially inferior to addressee	Standard Korean
Only Jeju natives	Informal	Participants are not emotionally intimate	Speaker is socially superior to addressee	Jeju / Jeju Korean
Only Jeju natives	Informal	Participants are emotionally intimate		Jeju / Jeju Korean

The same study notes that by 1992, even this variety restricted to the informal domain was usually a Korean dialect with a Jeju substratum, rather than the traditional Jeju language:

현재 상용되는 제주말의 경우, 표준말과의 차이가 과거에 비해 크게 줄어들고 있는 상황으로써 특히 어미활용에서 표준말과의 차이가 극대화되며, 다른 부분에서는 상대적으로 표준말과의 차이가 극소화된다는 점이다. 따라서 제주사람들은 과거 사용되던 토박이 말에 가까운 것은 '진한 (심한) 제주말'로, 현재 사용되는 제주말은 '옅은 제주말' 또는 '(표준어와) 섞어진 말'로 표현하는 등, 제주말과 표준말이 일종의 방언 연속체를 형성하는 것으로 인식하고 있다.

"As for the Jeju language [lit. 'Jeju speech'] in general use nowadays [as of 1992], the situation is that its differences from Standard Korean are greatly diminishing compared to the past. Its greatest differences with Standard Korean [now] lie especially in the suffix paradigm, and in other areas the differences are being minimized. The Jeju people accordingly understand that Jeju and Standard Korean are in a form of dialect continuum, and refer to the native language formerly in use as "thick (or intense) Jeju language" and the Jeju language currently in use as "light Jeju language" or "mixed (with Korean) language."

== Current status and ongoing endangerment ==
Since 2010, UNESCO has classified Jeju as a critically endangered language, defined as one whose "youngest speakers are grandparents and older... [who] speak the language partially and infrequently." In 2018, the Endangered Languages Archive at SOAS University of London collected audio and video recordings of native Jeju speakers having everyday conversations, singing traditional songs, and performing rituals.

The official language of South Korea is Standard Korean. Nearly all residents of Jeju Island are bilingual in Standard Korean and Jeju, while many younger individuals are even more fluent in English than in Jeju. Standard Korean is most commonly used in the majority of public areas, while Jeju tends to be reserved for use at home and a few local markets. All schools located on Jeju Island are required to teach Standard Korean and only offer Jeju as an elective course. In addition, many Jeju islanders migrate to mainland Korea for reasons such as education, employment, and marriage, contributing to decline of the Jeju language. As a result, there are currently no monolingual speakers of Jeju.

As of 2018, fluent speakers in Jeju Island were all over seventy years of age, while passive competence was found in some people in their forties and fifties. Younger Islanders speak Korean with Jeju substrate influence found in residual elements of the Jeju verbal paradigm and in select vocabulary such as kinship terms. The language is more vigorous in Osaka, where there may be fluent speakers born as late as the 1960s.

A 2008 survey of adult residents' knowledge of ninety Jeju cultural words showed that only twenty-one were understood by the majority of those surveyed. Lack of heritage knowledge of Jeju is even more severe among younger people. In 2010, 400 Jeju teenagers were surveyed for their knowledge of 120 basic Jeju vocabulary items, but only 19 words were recognized by the majority while 45 words were understood by less than 10%. A 2018 study suggests that even the verbal paradigm, among the more resilient parts of the substratum, may be in danger; the average middle schooler was more competent in the verb system of English, a language "taught only a few hours a week in school and in private tutoring institutions", than of Jeju.

=== Local attitudes towards Jeju ===
Historically, the Jeju language was seen as impolite or uncultured. Jeju uses fewer honorifics and has four levels of politeness, in comparison to the seven levels in Standard Korean. Because of the linguistic differences and cultural differences, Jeju Islanders were marginalized and excluded among mainland Koreans. In a 2011 Korea Times article, a student said they thought the language was not respectful enough to use with professors, and that the Seoul dialect was more sophisticated. In addition, Jeju is often associated with the countryside, as the majority of speakers tend to have traditional occupations, including farming, fishing, and diving. As a result, many younger children express a disinterest in learning the language.

==== Improving sentiment ====
Recent surveys show improved sentiment towards the Jeju language. In a National Institute of the Korean Language survey in 2005, only 9.4% of Jeju Islanders were very proud of the regional variety. When the same survey was readministered in 2015, 36.8% were very proud of the language, and Jeju Islanders had become the most likely among South Korean dialect groups to have "very positive" opinions of the regional variety. In a 2017 study of 240 Jeju Islanders, 82.8% of those sampled considered Jeju to be "nice to listen to", and 74.9% aspired to have their children learn the language. But significant generational differences in attitudes were also observed. For instance, only 13.8% of Jeju Islanders between 20 and 40 much preferred Jeju over Standard Korean, while 49.1% of those above 80 did.

In a 2013 survey of Jeju natives, 77.9% agreed with the statement that "[the Jeju language] has to be passed down as part of Jeju culture." But a 2015 study of approximately 1,000 Jeju Islanders suggests that even though most Jeju Islanders believe the language to be an important part of the island's culture, the vast majority are skeptical of the language's long-term viability, and more people are unwilling than willing to actively participate in language preservation efforts.

=== Revitalization efforts ===
ᄒᆞᆫ디 배우는 제주어 Hawndi Baeuneun Jeju-eo, an introductory textbook published by the Jeju Language Preservation Society

Revitalization efforts have been ongoing.

On 3 April 2017 A website was made to introduce visitors to the language and direct viewers to resources to learn. As of 17 October 2026, It still receives updates.

==== Government efforts ====
On 27 September 2007, the Jeju provincial government promulgated the Language Act for the Preservation and Promotion of the Jeju Language, which established five-year plans for state-backed language preservation. The Act encouraged public schools on Jeju Island to offer Jeju as an extracurricular activity, as well as to incorporate the language as a part of regular classes if relevant and feasible. In addition, multiple programs were provided for adults. For example, adult language programs are offered every year at the Jeju National University and are free of charge. There are also several local centres on Jeju Island that offer classes in Jeju Language specifically to marriage-based immigrants.

However, it was not until UNESCO's 2010 designation of Jeju as critically endangered that the provincial government became proactive in Jeju preservation efforts. In 2016, the provincial government allotted ₩685,000,000 (US$565,592 in 2016) to revitalization programs, and the government-funded Jeju Research Institute has compiled phrasebooks of the language. The provincial Ministry of Education has also published Jeju textbooks for elementary and secondary schools, although some textbooks really teach Standard Korean interspersed with Jeju lexical items. Some public schools offer after-school programs for Jeju, but the short duration of these classes may be insufficient to promote more than "symbolic" use by students. The linguistic competence of many teachers has also been challenged.

On 12 August 2011, the Research Centre for Jeju Studies was opened with the purpose of implementing projects for the revitalization and safeguarding of Jeju Language. The project encouraged the promotion of Jeju Language in schools by tasking the Education Bureau with several initiatives, including a training program for teachers. The project also started a radio broadcast in Jeju Language, as well as a radio campaign for Jeju slang and an annual Jeju Language festival. An iPhone application was developed, including a glossary, as well as a collection of proverbs, poems, and quizzes in Jeju Language. Finally, an introductory conversation brochure was distributed to both citizens and visitors of Jeju Island.

==== Popular media efforts ====
The Jeju Language Preservation Society, (Note: 제주어보전회; Jeju-eo bojeon-hoe) founded in December 2008, publishes a bimonthly Jeju-language magazine Deongdeureong-makke (덩드렁마께) and holds Jeju teaching programs and speaking contests. Children's books and a 2014 poetry anthology have also been published. Local bands and theater troupes have made Jeju-language performances. Regional newspapers such as the Jemin Ilbo and the Halla Ilbo include Jeju-language sections.

Local branches of KBS and MBC have launched Jeju radio programs and a television series. Recent South Korean media with nationwide appeal, including the 2010 television series Life is Beautiful and The Great Merchant, the 2012 drama film Jiseul, and the 2015 television series Warm and Cozy, have also featured spoken Jeju. A Wikipedia Incubator project for the Jeju Language has been active since 2019.

== Cultural differences ==
In addition to the difference in language and dialect, Jeju Islanders and mainland Koreans share a number of cultural differences.

The historical isolation and unique identity of Jeju Island, which have nourished a strong sense of regional pride and unity among Jeju inhabitants, are two significant cultural differences. Jeju Island's distinct cultural traditions, folk beliefs, and practices set it apart from the Korean mainland are a result of the island's geographic isolation. For example, Jeju's traditional women divers, or haenyeo, represent the ideals of resiliency, collaboration, and environmental care and represent the island's matriarchal legacy and collective spirit.

Moreover, Jeju Island's tumultuous history, including the Jeju rebellion and subsequent mass killings, has left a profound impact on the collective memory and social identity of Jeju Islanders. The trauma and scars of historical events continue to resonate in the cultural consciousness, shaping perceptions, attitudes, and behaviors among Jeju natives. These experiences have contributed to a distinct sense of identity and solidarity among Jeju Islanders, often manifesting in cultural expressions, artistic forms, and community rituals that reflect resilience and resistance against oppression.

Religious practices on Jeju Island encompass a diverse range of beliefs, including shamanism, Buddhism, and Christianity, each contributing to the island's rich religious heritage and spiritual landscape. These religious traditions intersect with cultural rituals and festivals, such as the annual Jeju Fire Festival and Seongsan Sunrise Festival, which celebrate Jeju's natural beauty, cultural heritage, and community solidarity.

== Orthography ==
Jeju has historically had no written language. Two recently devised standard orthographies are currently in use: a system created in 1991 by scholars of the Jeju Dialect Research Society, (Note: 제주방언연구회; Jeju bang'eon yeon'gu-hoe) and a system promulgated by the provincial government in 2014. Both systems use the Korean alphabet Hangul with one additional letter ㆍ, which was used in the Middle and Early Modern Korean scripts but is now defunct in written Korean. Similar to the modern Korean script, Jeju orthographies have morphophonemic tendencies, meaning that transcribing the underlying morphology generally takes precedence over the surface form. The two orthographies differ largely because they are based on different morphological analyses of the language, especially of the verbal paradigm, as seen in the example below.

Orthography	Underlying morphemes			Jeju word	Necessary analysis
Research Society orthography	나끄- nakkeu- "to fish"	-엄시 -eomsi CONT	-민 -min COND	나껌시민 nakkeomsimin "if [he] is fishing"	Stem-final vowel -eu is lost before vowel-initial suffix
Government orthography	낚- nakk- "to fish"	-어ᇝ -eoms CONT	-민 -min COND	낚어ᇝ이민 nakkeomsimin "if [he] is fishing"	Conditional suffix -min requires epenthetical vowel -i- after consonant

This article will use the government's orthography where the two differ.

=== Transliteration or romanization ===
The transliteration scheme generally used in Korean linguistics, including when transcribing Jeju, is the Yale Romanization system. Yang C., Yang S., and O'Grady 2019 instead use a variant of the reversible Revised Romanization system with the addition of the sequence aw for ㆍ /ɒ/.

This article also uses Revised Romanization with the addition of aw, but without Yang C., Yang S., and O'Grady 2019's one-to-one correspondence between Hangul glyphs and the Latin alphabet.

== Phonology ==
=== Consonants ===
The non-approximant consonants of Jeju correspond to the nineteen non-approximant consonants of Standard Korean, and Jeju displays the three-way contrast between stops and affricates characteristic of Modern Korean. Whether the voiced glottal fricative /ɦ/, absent in Standard Korean, exists as a phoneme in Jeju or merely as an allophone of /h/ remains disputed. A 2000 acoustic and aerodynamic study of eight native Jeju speakers concludes that "the consonants of the two languages seem to be the same in every respect... the phonetic realization of all [Jeju] consonants are the same as those found in [Seoul] Korean."

Consonant phonemes
		Bilabial	Alveolar	(Alveolo-) Palatal	Velar	Glottal
Nasal		m ㅁ	n ㄴ		ŋ ㅇ (Note: In syllable-final position only)	
Stop and affricate	lax	p ㅂ	t ㄷ	tɕ ㅈ	k ㄱ	
Stop and affricate	tense	p͈ ㅃ	t͈ ㄸ	t͈ɕ ㅉ	k͈ ㄲ	
Stop and affricate	aspirated	pʰ ㅍ	tʰ ㅌ	tɕʰ ㅊ	kʰ ㅋ	
Fricative	lax/aspirated		s ㅅ			h ㅎ (ɦ ㅇ)
Fricative	tense		s͈ ㅆ			
Liquid			l~ɾ ㄹ			
Approximant		w		j	(ɰ)	

==== Consonantal phonological processes ====
Jeju allophony involves a number of phonological processes also found in Seoul Korean. As in Korean, /l/ surfaces as [ɾ] intervocally. Also as in Korean, lax stops and affricates have fully voiced allophones in medial position, all obstruents have unreleased allophones in final position, and syllable-final sibilants surface as [t̚]. Whether non-lax stops and affricates (Note: Other than /p͈/) can appear in final position is controversial. The morphological analysis necessary for the government's orthography permits them, while the analysis behind the Jeju Language Research Society's orthography forbids them.

Lax obstruent	ㄱ g	ㄷ d	ㅅ s	ㅈ j	ㅂ b
Initial allophone	k~kʰ	t~tʰ	s	tɕ~tɕʰ	p~pʰ
Medial allophone	ɡ	d	s~z	dʑ	b
Final allophone	k̚	t̚			p̚

Most non-morphophonological consonant assimilation rules of Standard Korean are also found in Jeju. /s/ and /s͈/ are regularly palatalized to [ʃ] before /i/ or /j/. Lax obstruents are tensed following another obstruent. /h/ aspirates both the preceding and the subsequent lax obstruent. A nasal consonant nasalizes a preceding obstruent or /h/. /l/ becomes [n] following all consonants except itself or /n/, and this [n] can itself nasalize the preceding obstruent so that the underlying sequence /pl/ is realized as [mn]. On the other hand, underlying /ln/ and /nl/ both produce [ll].

Non-morphophonological consonant allophony
Jeju word	Underlying phonemes	Realization	
심 "strength"	/sim/	[ʃim]	Palatalization before high vowel /i/
역불 "on purpose"	/jəkpul/	[jək̚p͈ul]	Lax obstruent tensed after another obstruent
밧갈쉐 "ox"	/paskalswe/	[pat̚k͈alswe]	Lax obstruent tensed after another obstruent
흡헬귀 "bloodsucker"	/hɨphelkwi/	[hɨpʰelɡwi]	/h/ aspirates surrounding obstruents
돗늬 "pig's tooth"	/tosn(ɰ)i/	[tonni]	Nasals nasalize preceding obstruent
녹낭 "camphor tree"	/noknaŋ/	[noŋnaŋ]	Nasals nasalize preceding obstruent
섭낭 "firewood"	/səpnaŋ/	[səmnaŋ]	Nasals nasalize preceding obstruent
멩랑 "cleverness"	/meŋlaŋ/	[meŋnaŋ]	/l/ is realized as [n] after most consonants; underlying /l/ will nasalize preceding obstruent
섭력 "cooperation"	/səpljək/	[səmnjək̚]	/l/ is realized as [n] after most consonants; underlying /l/ will nasalize preceding obstruent
칼ᄂᆞᆯ "blade"	/kʰalnɒl/	[kʰallɒl]	/l/ assimilates both preceding and subsequent /n/
곤란 "difficulty"	/konlan/	[kollan]	/l/ assimilates both preceding and subsequent /n/

Jeju also has consonant allophones that appear only at morpheme boundaries. Some of these are found in Standard Korean, such as the insertion of [n] before i- or j- at most word-internal morpheme boundaries; the palatalization of /t/ to [dʑ] before an affixal -i; and the tensing of obstruents following certain morpheme-final nasals. Other rules are absent in Standard Korean. For instance, a sonorant-final word or morpheme can trigger aspiration (for older speakers) or tensing (for younger speakers) in a subsequent lax consonant. In some cases this is due to an underlying consonant cluster, but not all cases can be explained in this way. Other Jeju-specific processes include the doubling of a word-final consonant when followed by a vowel, glide, or /h/, and the lenition of /p/ to [w] at some word boundaries.

Consonant allophony at morpheme boundaries
Jeju word (morphemes hyphenated)	Underlying phonemes	Realization	
쏙입 ssog-ip "inner leaf"	/s͈okip/	[s͈oŋnip̚]	n-insertion before /i/
ᄆᆞᆮ이 mawd-i "eldest child"	/mɒti/	[mɒdʑi]	/t/ palatalized before /i/, voiced in medial position
검수다 keom-su-da "to be black" [honoring addressee]	/kəmsuta/	[kəms͈uda]	Obstruent tensed after verb stem-final nasal
술벵 sul-beng "alcohol bottle"	/sulpeŋ/	[sulpʰeŋ]	Aspiration after sonorant (for older speakers)
빵집 ppang-jip "bakery"	/p͈aŋtɕip/	[p͈aŋtɕʰip̚]	Aspiration after sonorant (for older speakers)
일월 il-weol "January"	/ilwəl/	[illwəl]	Consonant doubling
지집아이 jijib-ai "girl"	/tɕitɕipai/	[tɕidʑip̚p͈ai]	Consonant doubling
대왓 (from 대+밧 dae-bat) "bamboo field"	/tæpat/	[tæwat̚]	Lenition of /p/

Verbal conjugation can also lead to consonantal changes. Verb stem-final /l/ and /h/ are lost before /n/. In the case of verb stems ending in -d, -p. -s, and -k, the final consonants are always preserved in so-called regular verbs, but in irregular verbs, -d and -p are lenited to [ɾ] and [u~w] respectively while -s and -k are lost when followed by a vowel.

Final-consonant allomorphy in irregular verbs
Underlying morphemes		Surface realization	Regular verb
ᄃᆞᆮ- dawd- "to run"	-곡 -gok CONN	ᄃᆞᆮ곡 dawt-gok "runs, and"	받곡 bat-gok "receives, and"
ᄃᆞᆮ- dawd- "to run"	-아 -a SE	ᄃᆞᆯ아 dawr-a "runs"	받아 bad-a "receives"
빕- bib- "to pour"	-곡 -gok CONN	빕곡 bip-gok "pours, and"	입곡 ip-gok "wears, and"
빕- bib- "to pour"	-어 -eo SE	비워 biw-eo "pours"	입어 ib-eo "wears"
짓- jis- "to compose writing"	-곡 -gok CONN	짓곡 jit-gok "composes writing, and"	짓곡 jit-gok "builds, and"
짓- jis- "to compose writing"	-어 -eo SE	지어 ji-eo "composes writing"	짓어 jis-eo "builds"
눅- nug- "to lie down" (Note: The only k-irregular verb)	-곡 -gok CONN	눅곡 nuk-gok "lies down, and"	먹곡 meok-gok "eats, and"
눅- nug- "to lie down"	-어 -eo SE	누어 nu-eo "lies down"	먹어 meog-eo "eats"

==== Underlying consonant clusters ====
While not permitted in the surface representation of Jeju, morpheme-final consonant clusters can exist in the underlying form. Many cases of post-sonorant aspiration involve morphemes whose Middle Korean cognates feature a final -h, suggesting that an underlying final -h after the sonorant should be posited in Jeju as well. Besides these h-final clusters, Jeju permits a number of other final consonant clusters, including -lk (ㄺ), -lm (ㄻ), -mk~ŋk (ᇚ~ᇬ), -sk (ㅺ), and (in the analysis of the government's orthography) -ms (ㅯ). These clusters surface as a single consonant in isolation or before a consonant, but are fully realized when followed by a vowel.

Realization of final consonant clusters
Underlying form	Realization in isolation/before consonant	Realization before vowel
ᄇᆞᆰ- /pɒlk/ "to be bright"	ᄇᆞᆰ고 [pɒk̚k͈o]	ᄇᆞᆰ언 [pɒlɡən]
삶 /salm/ "life"	삶 [sam]	삶이 [salmi]
나ᇚ ~ 나ᇬ ~ 낭 /namk ~ naŋk ~ naŋ/ "tree"	남 ~ 낭 [nam ~ naŋ]	남기 ~ 낭기 ~ 낭이 [namɡi ~ naŋɡi ~ naŋi]
-어ᇝ /əms/ CONT	데껴ᇝ가 [tek͈jəmɡa]	데꼄서 [tek͈jəmsə]
바ᇧ /pask/ "outside"	바ᇧ [pat̚]	밧기 [pat̚k͈i]

=== Vowels ===
Jeju traditionally has a nine-vowel system: the eight vowels of Korean with the addition of ㆍ /ɒ/, a Middle Korean phoneme lost in Seoul in the eighteenth century. The Jeju-do dialect is known to exhibit more conservative vowel sounds preserving older vowel distinctions, compared to standard Korean.

Vowel phonemes (Note: As given in Yang C, Yang S., & O'Grady 2019)
	Front		Central		Back	
Close	ㅣ i	/i/	ㅡ eu	/ɨ/	ㅜ u	/u/
Mid	ㅔ e	/e/	ㅓ eo	/ə/	ㅗ o	/o/
Open	ㅐ ae	/æ/	ㅏ a	/a/	ㆍ aw	/ɒ/

The phonemic identity of ㆍ is controversial, but native speakers most commonly realize the phoneme as [ɔ]. /æ/ and /e/ are only distinguished in the initial syllable.

Among younger and less fluent speakers, /æ/ and /ɒ/ have both raised to /e/ and /o/ or /ə/ (Note: /ɒ/ merges with /o/ in the initial syllable and with /ə/ in non-initial ones. An apparent fronting of /ɒ/ to /a/, seen in heritage speakers born in the 1980s, is not a genuine Jeju development but simply interference from Standard Korean, where /a/ is cognate to Jeju /ɒ/.) respectively, resulting in a seven-vowel system identical to the vowel inventory of Seoul Korean. The raising of Jeju /æ/ occurred before the raising of /ɒ/, and may have predated Standard Korean's ongoing merger of /æ/ and /e/. The subsequent loss of /ɒ/ may have been motivated by a language-internal desire for symmetry in the vowel system. On the other hand, the vowel mergers are accelerated among Jeju speakers living in coastal communities more exposed to Standard Korean.

Jeju has two or three glides: /j/, /w/, and possibly /ɰ/. /j/ can occur with all vowels except /i/ and /ɨ/. /jæ/ and /je/ have merged even among speakers who distinguish the monophthongs, and many speakers who retain /ɒ/ also merge /jɒ/ with /jə/. /w/ cannot occur with the three back vowels or with /ɨ/. /ɰ/ occurs only with /i/, and the resulting diphthong /ɰi/ is generally realized as [ɨ] word-initially and [i] otherwise.

Glide-vowel sequences may be analyzed as diphthongs, with the phonemic identities of [j], [w], and [ɰ] being /i/, /o~u/, and /ɨ/ respectively.

IPA	Hangul	Example	
/je/	ㅖ, ㅒ	예숙제낄락 yesukjekkillak	"quiz; riddle"
/ja/	ㅑ	야개기 yagaegi	"neck"
/jo/	ㅛ	요레 yore	"here; this place"
/ju/	ㅠ	유ᄒᆞᆨ yuhawk	"Confucianism"
/jə/	ㅕ	역ᄉᆞ yeoksaw	"history"
/jɒ/	ᆢ	ᄋᆢ라 yawra	"several"
/wi/	ㅟ	위염 wiyeom	"danger"
/we/	ㅞ, ㅙ, ㅚ	웬착 wenchak	"left side"
/wa/	ㅘ	와리다 warida	"to be in a hurry"
/wə/	ㅝ	월력 weollyeok	"calendar"
/ɰi/	ㅢ	의남 uinam~eunam	"fog"

==== Vowel phonological processes ====
Several phonological processes affect the surface realization of Jeju vowels. In one process shared with Standard Korean, a bisyllabic vowel sequence may be contracted to a monosyllabic polyphthong.

English	Uncontracted Jeju form	Contracted Jeju form
"it was caught"	젭히엇저 jepieotjeo	젭혓저 jepyeotjeo
"cucumber"	오이 oi	웨 we

Vowel-affecting processes are particularly numerous in the verbal paradigm. Verb stem-final -eu is lost before a vowel-initial suffix. Similar to Standard Korean, a stem-final -i diphthongizes a subsequent vowel by inserting the onglide [j]. Unlike in its sister language, Jeju j-insertion may occur even with an intervening consonant, and between a verb stem ending in -e, -ae, or -aw and a suffix with initial eo-.

Many of Jeju's consonant-initial verbal suffixes take an initial epenthetic vowel if the previous morpheme ends with a consonant. (Note: Excluding the liquid consonant /l/) The default epenthetic vowel is -으- -eu- /ɨ/, but the vowel surfaces as -이- -i- [i] following a sibilant and as -우- -u- [u] following an underlying labial.

Vowel shifts in conjugated verbs
English	Underlying morphemes			Surface realization
"is sad, and"	슬프- seulpeu- "to be sad"	-엉 -eong CONN		슬펑 seulp-eong
"rests, and"	쉬- swi- "to rest"	-엉 -eong CONN		쉬영 swi-yeong
"was fast"	제- je- "to be fast"	-엇 -eos PFV	-어 -eo SE	제엿어 je-yeos-eo
"mixed with water"	개- gae- "to mix with water"	-엇 -eos PFV	-어 -eo SE	개엿어 gae-yeos-eo
"did"	ᄒᆞ haw- "to do"	-엇 -eos PFV	-어 -eo SE	ᄒᆞ엿어 haw-yeos-eo
"if [it] burns"	카- ka- "to burn"	-민 -min COND		카민 ka-min
"if [he] believes"	믿- mid- "to believe"	-민 -min COND		믿으민 mid-eumin
"if [it] is bad"	줏- jus- "to pick"	-민 -min COND		줏이민 jus-imin
"if [he] puts in the soup"	ᄌᆞᆷ- jawm- "to put into soup"	-민 -min COND		ᄌᆞᆷ우민 jawm-umin

Like Standard Korean but unlike Middle Korean, Koreanic vowel harmony is no longer generally applicable in all native morphemes but remains productive in sound symbolism and certain verbal suffixes. Jeju has two harmonic classes, yin and yang. The neutral vowel /i/ can occur with either class.

Harmonic class	Vowel correspondences				Sound symbolism
Yin	ə	u	e	ɨ	Dark; heavy; dull; negative
Yang	a	o	æ	ɒ	Bright; light; sharp; positive
Neutral	i				—N/a

For instance, the perfective aspect marker -엇 -eos takes the vowel harmonic allomorph -앗 -as after verb stems whose (final) vowel is yang:

Yin-class allomorph	Yang-class allomorph
먹엇어 meog-eos-eo "ate"	갈앗어 gar-as-eo "plowed"
궂엇어 guj-eos-eo "was bad"	곱앗어 gob-as-eo "hid"
긋엇어 geus-eos-eo "drew a line"	ᄃᆞᆯ앗어 dawr-as-eo "ran"
싯엇어 sis-eos-eo "washed"

In certain cases, suffix allomorphs do not match the harmonic class of the previous vowel. Verb stems with final vowel /u/ or /ɨ/ take the yang allomorph if their Middle Korean forms were /ɒ/, thus conserving their original harmonic class while violating their current one. Disyllabic stems that end in -u also take the yang allomorph, but monosyllabic -u stems or disyllabic -uC stems do not.

=== Phonotactics ===
Jeju syllable structure is (C)(G)V(C) with G being a glide.

Syllable structure	Jeju	IPA
V	이 i "this"	[i]
CV	따 tta "earth"	[t͈a]
GV (or VV)	웨 we "cause; principle"	[we]
CGV (or CVV)	쉬 swi "filling" [for dumplings, etc.]	[swi]
VC	알 al "egg"	[al]
CVC	ᄀᆞᆺ kawt "edge"	[kɔt̚]
GVC (or VVC)	윳 yut "neighbor"	[jut̚]
CGVC (or CVVC)	광 kwang "lunatic"	[kwaŋ]

As in Standard Korean, ng- /ŋ/ cannot occur syllable-initially, and l- /l/ does not occur word-initially in native words.

=== Prosody ===
Jeju does not have phonemic vowel length, stress, or tone. Its phonological hierarchy is characterized by accentual phrases similar to those of Standard Korean, with a basic Low-High-Low-High tonal pattern varying according to sentence type, but there are also important differences in the two languages' prosody. Jeju has a weaker tonal distinction within the first half of the accentual phrase than Seoul Korean does, while its aspirate consonants do not produce as significant a high pitch as their Seoul equivalents. Jeju uses more contour tones, where the pitch shifts within a single syllable, than Seoul Korean. Unlike in Seoul Korean, older and fluent speakers of Jeju will also lengthen the final vowel of both clauses in alternative questions.

== Grammar ==
Jeju is typologically similar to Korean, both being head-final agglutinative languages. However, the two languages show significant differences in the verbal paradigm, such as Jeju's use of a dedicated conditional suffix.

=== Nouns ===
Jeju nouns may be a single morpheme, a compound of multiple nouns, or a base noun with a merged attributive verb, or form through derivational affixes attached to nouns or verb stems. In compound nouns that include a native morpheme, the phoneme -s- may intervene between the two elements. Because this "in-between s" appears only after a vowel and before a consonant, it is never realized as [s] but almost always surfaces as [t̚].

- Single-morpheme noun: 쉐 swe "cattle"
- Noun compound:

쉐 + 궤기 → 쉐궤기
swe {} gwegi {} swe-gwegi
"cattle" {} "meat" {} "beef"

- Noun compound with -s-:

다리 + 빙 → 다릿빙
dari {} bing {} dari-t-bing
"leg" {} "illness" {} {"leg illness"}

- Noun with merged attributive verb:

앚- + 일 → 앚인일
aj- {} il {} aj-in-il
{"to sit"} {} "work" {} {"work done while sitting"}

- Noun derived from noun through affix:

ᄌᆞᆷ → ᄌᆞᆷ주시
jawm {} jawm-jusi
"sleep" {} "sleepyhead"

- Noun derived from verb through affix:

먹- → 먹쉬
meog- {} meog-swi
{"to eat"} {} "glutton"

- Verbal noun:

ᄃᆞᆺ- → ᄃᆞᆺ임
daws- {} daws-im
{"to be warm"} {} "warmth"

(Examples from Yang C., Yang S, and O'Grady 2019 and Ko J. 2011a)

Some Jeju nouns are bound nouns, meaning that they cannot appear independently without a noun phrase. The example below features the bound noun 침 chim "worth" accompanied by the obligatory attributive verb.

볼 침 읏저
bo-l chim eus-jeo
see-FUT.ATTR worth not.be-DEC
"hardly worth seeing"

Jeju has two suffixing plural markers, which are obligatory for plural nouns accompanied by determiners and optional otherwise. The plural marker -덜 -deol can occur with all nouns and pronouns. The marker -네 -ne is restricted for humans and pronouns, and can also have an associative meaning: e.g. 만수네 Mansu-ne "Mansu and his family" (lit. 'Mansu and his associates'). The combined sequence -네덜 -ne-deol is sometimes also used.

Nouns accompanied by numerals usually take a variety of classifiers, such as 재 jae for counting trees and 곡지 gokji for counting songs. Classifiers for cardinals are unmarked, but those for ordinals are followed by the ordinal-marking 체 che.

낭 ᄒᆞᆫ **재**
nang hawn **jae**
tree one CLF
"one tree"

낭 두 **재** 체
nang du **jae** che
tree two CLF ORD
"the second tree"

==== Noun particles ====
Jeju marks noun case and other semantic relations through suffixing noun particles. Particles that mark the nominative, accusative, and genitive cases are very frequently omitted. The table below is not exhaustive and lists only some of the most significant particles.

Function	Particle (Note: Parts in parentheses are omitted following vowels)	Allomorphy and variants	Example	Usage notes
Nominative (Note: Yang C., Yang S., and O'Grady 2019 also classifies -(i)seo and -ra/re as nominative particles, but Kim Jee-hong points out that they are restricted in use and can be topicalized, and should thus be seen as nominative constructions that rely on non-nominative morphemes.)	이 -i	After vowel: 가 -ga	할망**이** ᄀᆞᆯ안야? halmang-**i** gawr-an-ya "Did grandmother say that?"	Does not appear in the complement, unlike in Standard Korean. Cannot be topicalized.
Accusative	을 -(eu)l	Rare, formal post-vowel form: 를 -reul	시리레 ᄀᆞ를 담으라. siri-re gawreu-**l** dam-eura "Put the flour into the steamer."	Unlike in Korean, can be followed by other particles, e.g. 늘광 neu-l-gwang 2SG-ACC-COM "with you".
Genitive	이/의 -i	—N/a	집**이** 밧은 어듸 잇어? jib-**i** bas-eun eodui is-eo "Where is your family'**s** field?"	-i is rare, but required when the subsequent noun phrase begins with an adnominal clause.
Genitive	ㅅ -s	—N/a	산 읫 낭 san ui-**t** nang "the trees on the mountain"	Called "pseudo-genitive" in Yang C., Yang S., and O'Grady 2019. Appears in certain compounds, as mentioned above. May also follow a locative marker to attribute a noun.
Dative	ᄀᆞ라 -gawra	—N/a	가의**ᄀᆞ라** 공븨ᄒᆞ렌 ᄒᆞᆸ서. gaui-**gawra** gongbui-haw-ren haw-b-seo "Please tell him to study."	Restricted to human addressees of verbs of speaking.
Dative	신디 -sindi	—N/a	그 사름**신디** ᄀᆞᆯ읍디가? geu sareum-**sindi** gawr-eup-di-ga "Did you talk **to** that person?"	May be used with the verb 싯다 sitda "to exist" to form possessive constructions, with the dative marking the possessor. May also be suffixed with the allative particle -re to give further emphasis and a connotation of movement, or with the locative particle -seo to express an ablative meaning.
Dative	안티 -anti	Due to interference from Korean cognate 한테 -hante: 한티 -hanti, 안테 -ante	느**안티** 주마. neu-**anti** ju-ma "I will give [it] **to** you."	May be used with the verb 싯다 sitda "to exist" to form possessive constructions, with the dative marking the possessor. May also be suffixed with the allative particle -re to give further emphasis and a connotation of movement, or with the locative particle -seo to express an ablative meaning.
Dative	아피 -api	—N/a	누게**아피** 줍디가? nuge-**api** ju-p-di-ga "**To** whom did you give [it]?"	May be used with the verb 싯다 sitda "to exist" to form possessive constructions, with the dative marking the possessor. May also be suffixed with the allative particle -re to give further emphasis and a connotation of movement, or with the locative particle -seo to express an ablative meaning.
Topic-marking	은 -(eu)n	Rarely, after vowel: 는 -neun	오널**은** 궹일날이우다. oneor-**eun** gwengilnal-i-u-da "Today is Sunday."	Either introduces a new topic or establishes a contrast. Must have a contrastive meaning sentence-internally.
Topic-marking	(이)랑 -(i)rang (Note: Initial segment also lost after liquid consonant -l)	—N/a	하르방**이랑** 저레 앚입서. hareubang-**irang** jeo-re aj-ib-seo "Grandfather [and not anyone else], sit there."	Contrastive meaning only.
Topic-marking	(이)라근 -(i)rageun	Also used: (이)라근에 -(i)rageune	느**라근** 집이 가라. neu-**rageun** jib-i ga-ra. "You [and not anyone else], go home."	Contrastive meaning only.
Location-related	이/의 -i	After -i and possibly -l: 에 -e Occasionally after any vowel: 예 -ye	성 바당**의** 셔? seong badang-**i** sy-eo "Is my older sibling **at** the sea?"	Refers to location for stative verbs and direction for dynamic verbs; may also refer to time. According to Kim Jee-hong 2015, -(y)e is not an allomorph but a different locative morpheme used for clearly bounded spaces, such as tables or containers.
Location-related	(이)서/(의)서 -(i)seo	Post-vowel form -seo sometimes occurs after consonant.	ᄒᆞᆨ게**서** 공븨ᄒᆞ게. hawkge-**seo** gongbui-haw-ge "Let's study **at** school."	Refers to location for action verbs.
Location-related	디, 디서 -di, -diseo	—N/a	밧**디** bat-**di** "**In** the field"	Variants of -i, -iseo used to emphasize the boundedness of the referent. Analyzed by Yang S., Yang C., and O'Grady 2019 not as a separate morpheme but as a bound noun meaning "place", juxtaposed with the locational noun.
Location-related	(드)레 -(deu)re	After liquid consonant -l and sometimes after vowel: 르레/러레 -leure/leore Initial syllable deu- also found as deo-, teu-, ti-, di-, de-, or ri-	이착**드레** 비와불라. i-chak-**deure** biw-a-bul-la "Pour [it] **to** this side."	Denotes direction of movement, like English "to; into; toward". Moon S. and Kim W. 2017 analyzes 레 -re and 드레 -deure as distinct particles, with -re having a solely directional meaning while -deure simultaneously emphasizes both the direction and the location of the direction's destination. Most sources treat the two as allomorphs, especially when appended to nouns.
Comitative and conjunctive	(이)영 -(i)yeong	—N/a	가읜 어멍이영 ᄉᆞ답ᄒᆞ염ㅅ우게. gaui-n eomeong-**iyeong** sawdab-haw-yeoms-u-ge "S/he is doing the laundry **with** his/her mom."	Kim Jee-hong 2015 notes: "These case markers only have differences of connotation, and may be interchangeably used without the least change in meaning." Like in Middle Korean but unlike in Modern Seoul Korean, comitative markers may occur on the final element being linked and also take other case markers. 책광 가방**광을** 주다 chaek-gwang gabang-**gwang**-**eul** ju-da book-COM bag-COM-ACC give-SE "Give books and bags"
Comitative and conjunctive	왕/광 -(g)wang (Note: Some vowel-final stems take -gwang)	—N/a	지슬광 ᄃᆞᆨ세기 jiseul-**gwang** dawksegi "potatoes **and** eggs"	Kim Jee-hong 2015 notes: "These case markers only have differences of connotation, and may be interchangeably used without the least change in meaning." Like in Middle Korean but unlike in Modern Seoul Korean, comitative markers may occur on the final element being linked and also take other case markers. 책광 가방**광을** 주다 chaek-gwang gabang-**gwang**-**eul** ju-da book-COM bag-COM-ACC give-SE "Give books and bags"
Comitative and conjunctive	ᄒᆞ곡 -hawgok	Also used: ᄒᆞ고 -hawgo	낭ᄒᆞ고 고장 ᄒᆞᄊᆞᆯ 싱그라. nang-**hawgok** gojang hawsseul singgeu-ra "Please plant some trees **and** flowers."	Kim Jee-hong 2015 notes: "These case markers only have differences of connotation, and may be interchangeably used without the least change in meaning." Like in Middle Korean but unlike in Modern Seoul Korean, comitative markers may occur on the final element being linked and also take other case markers. 책광 가방**광을** 주다 chaek-gwang gabang-**gwang**-**eul** ju-da book-COM bag-COM-ACC give-SE "Give books and bags"

=== Verbs ===
The Jeju verb consists of a root that is followed by suffixes that provide grammatical information such as voice, tense, aspect, mood, evidentiality, relative social status, and the formality of the utterance. Jeju verbs include not only action verbs familiar to English speakers such as 먹다 meokda "to eat" or 베리다 berida "to see", but also adjectival verbs such as 버치다 beochida "to be heavy" or 훍다 hultta "to be thick". Verbs can take derivational suffixes to form adverbs and nouns.

- ᄇᆞ디- bawdi- "to be close" → ᄇᆞ디**게** bawdi-**ge** "close**ly**"
- 궂- guj- "to be bad" → 궂**임** guj-**im** "bad**ness**"
- 입- ib- "to wear" → 입**기** ip-**gi** "wear**ing**"

Especially for wh-questions and exclamations, Jeju speakers commonly use a verbal noun in place of a verb inflected for tense-aspect-mood.

날도 영 ᄃᆞᆺ임광!
nal-do yeong daws-im-gwang
day-even like.this warm-NMLZ-COM
"What a warm day!" (lit. 'With the warmth of even the day like this!')

Verbs may also be given an attributive meaning through one of four adnominal suffixes.

- Adnominal suffix 은 -(eu)n: (Note: Initial vowel -eu- has epenthetical vowel allomorphs) Past event for action verbs, achieved state for adjectival verbs

나가 탄 미깡
na-ga ta-**n** mikkang
"The tangerine that I picked"

ᄃᆞᆺ**인** 구들
daws-**in** gudeul
"The [already] warm room"

- Adnominal suffix 단 -dan: Habitual action in the past

뎅기**단** 웃드르
denggi-**dan** utdeureu
"The mountain villages that we used to go to"

ᄃᆞᆺ**단** 구들
daws-**dan** gudeul
"The room that used to be warm"

- Adnominal suffix (으)는 -(eu)neun: Nonpast/present event or state, commonly habitual; cannot occur with other suffixes and must combine directly with the bare verb stem; can occur with adjectival verbs, unlike in Korean

아**는** 예청
a-**neun** yecheong
"The woman who I know"

ᄃᆞᆺ**이는** 구들
daws-**ineun** gudeul
"The [usually] warm room"

- Adnominal suffix 을 -(eu)l: Future/conjectural event or state

ᄐᆞᆮ을 ᄉᆞᆼ키
tawd-eul sawngki
"Vegetables that s/he will pluck"

==== Pre-final suffixes ====
Jeju has a number of pre-final verbal suffixes: tense-aspect-mood markers which follow the verb stem but cannot appear at the end of the inflected verb. The exact number of these suffixes is unclear because scholars disagree on the correct morphological segmentation. One analysis of the suffix paradigm, as presented in Yang C., Yang S., and O'Grady 2019, is given below.

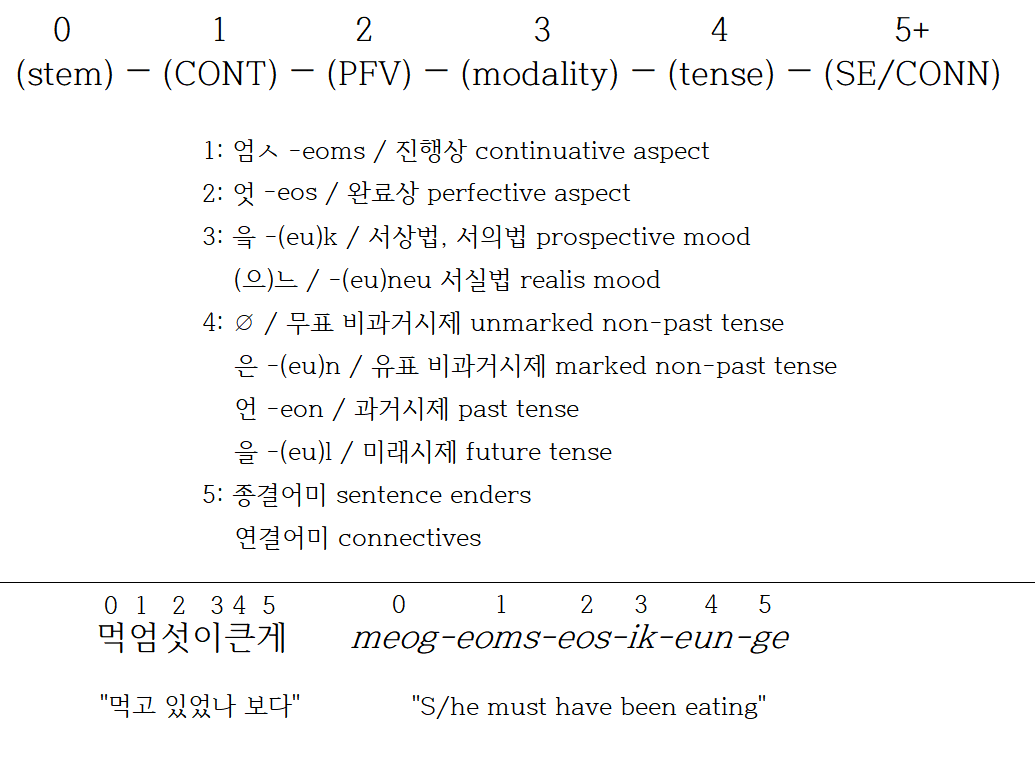

There is relatively widespread agreement on the existence of the following four discrete TAM morphemes, presented in the order they co-occur: the continuative aspect marker 어ᇝ -eoms, the perfective aspect marker 엇 -eos, the prospective mood marker 읔 -(eu)k, and the realis mood marker (으)느 -(eu)neu. Depending on the analysis of the aforementioned epenthetical vowels that precede many verbal suffixes, the base forms of the three morphemes may alternately be analyzed as 엄시 -eomsi, 어시 -eosi, 크 -keu, and 느 -neu.

-eoms(i) is an imperfective or continuative aspect particle, referring to a process perceived as ongoing and similar to the English construction "be VERB-ing." With an adjectival verb, it has an inchoative ("beginning to; become") meaning. A verb with -eoms(i) is interpreted as either present or future by default, and some analyses interpret the particle as also conveying the present tense for specific events and states. The suffix has a vowel-harmonic variant -ams(i), as well as allomorphs -yeoms(i), -yams(i), and -ms(i) when following certain vowels.

ᄀᆞᆯ개비 ᄎᆞᆽ아ᇝ어.
gawlgaebi chawj-**ams**-eo
frog search-CONT-SE
"S/he is looking for the frog."

짚어ᇝ저.
jip-**eoms**-jeo
be.deep-CONT-SE
"It is becoming deep."

Often characterized as a perfective aspect marker, -eos(i) has also been described as a present perfect marker and as behaving as a perfective marker with some verbs and as a past tense marker with others. -eos(i) can express non-past events in certain constructions that call for verbs "conceptualized in their entirety", such as a hypothetical future event. In adjectival verbs, it may also refer to a current state that contrasts with a past situation. -eos(i) can also be doubled for a habitual or a past perfect interpretation. Also like -eoms, this suffix takes the vowel-harmonic variant -as(i) and has allomorphs -yeos(i), -yas(i), and -s(i) after certain vowels.

지슬 팟저.
jiseul pa-**t**-jeo
potato dig-PFV-SE
"S/he dug potatoes."

날 막 얼엇저.
nal mak eor-**eot**-jeo
day very be.cold-PFV-SE
"It is very cold [compared to before]."

The prospective mood marker 읔/으크 -(eu)k/(eu)keu marks the subject's intention in first-person-subject declarative sentences or second-person-subject interrogative sentences, and the speaker's conjecture otherwise. -(eu)k may also have a future-tense interpretation.

ᄂᆞᆷ삐 데끼켜.
nawmppi dekki-**k**-yeo
radish throw-PROSP-SE
"I will throw away the radish."

가이 지레가 크클아.
gai jire-ga keu-**k**-eur-a (Note: According to the segmentation of Yang C., Yang S., and O'Grady 2019. May also be segmented as gai jire-ga keu-keu-ra 3SG height-NOM grow-PROSP-SE See section Tense-marking.)
3SG height-NOM grow-PROSP-FUT-SE
"It seems that s/he will grow tall."

-(eu)k can only be followed by a small number of suffixes in Yang C., Yang S., and O'Grady 2019's analysis. Some analyses treat the initial vowel of the following suffix as part of an allomorph or nuanced variant of -(eu)k, so that 가커라 gakeora "[I] will go" may be segmented as ga-k-eora or ga-keo-ra.

The realis or indicative mood marker (으)느 -(eu)neu indicates "a fact or habitual action in the nonpast" which the speaker perceives to be true in general, permanently, or over a longer duration of time, as demonstrated in the contrast below. The putative non-past-tense marker -(eu)n may also be analyzed as an allomorph of -(eu)neu. In this context, the morpheme -(eu)n(eu) has also been interpreted as a perfect marker (not to be confused with the perfective marker).

이 신 느안티 크냐?
i sin neu-anti keu-nya (Note: In Yang C., Yang S., and O'Grady 2019's segmentation, -nya is two morphemes.)
this shoe 2SG-DAT be.big-INTR
"Is this shoe [too] big for you [right now]?"

이 신 느안티 크느냐?
i sin neu-anti keu-**neu**-nya
this shoe 2SG-DAT be.big-IND-INTR
"Has this shoe [always] been [too] big for you?"

The existence of the Korean subject-honorific marker (으)시 -(eu)si is controversial for Jeju, with some scholars arguing that it was entirely absent and others that it was restricted to higher registers. Ko J. 2011b notes that it was used only "by officials while referring to people of very high status and by the seonbi of the educated classes."

==== Segmenting verb-final suffixes ====
The segmentation of verb-final elements is controversial. The two recent extensive treatments of the topic, Yang C., Yang S., and O'Grady 2019 and Kim Jee-hong 2015, give incompatible analyses of the suffix paradigm.

Yang C., Yang S., and O'Grady 2019 includes a slot for tense in the Jeju verb, with three dedicated markers.

- Non-past tense: 은 -(eu)n
- Past tense: 언 -eon, with vowel-harmonic allomorph 안 -an
- Future tense: 을 -(eu)l

They further divide verb-final suffixes into three categories: Type 1, which cannot occur with tense markers; Type 2, which must occur with either a tense marker or the aspect marker -eoms, which loses its underlying -s before a Type 2 suffix; and a mixed type, which can occur with the non-past marker but not with the other two tense markers. The vast majority of suffixes are categorized as Tense 1 and thus cannot follow a tense marker. Uniquely among pre-final suffixes, the past tense marker -eon can also appear without a final suffix.

Examples of Yang C., Yang S., and O'Grady 2019's segmentation are given below.

Aspect + Type 1 sequence

지슬 ᄆᆞᆫ 데꼇어라.
jiseul mawn dekky-eos-eora
potato all throw-PFV-SE
"[I noticed that he/she] had thrown away all the potatoes."

Tense + Type 2 sequence

파치 잘 줏언게.
pachi jal jus-eon-ge
fallen.tangerines well pick-PST-SE
"[I saw him/her] pick tangerines well."

In Kim Jee-hong's analysis, verb-final single morphemes are termed "canonical endings". Canonical endings are contrasted with a wide variety of "non-canonical endings", formed by the fusion of various grammatical elements such as multiple canonical endings, truncated conjunctive and embedded sentences, and bound nouns (Note: Called "formative" by Kim Jee-hong) connected to the verb stem or a canonical ending via an attributive or a nominalizer. The most common canonical component of these non-canonical endings is the suffix 어 -eo (vowel-harmonic allomorph 아 -a), which Kim calls the unmarked "default ending".

Since Yang C., Yang S., and O'Grady 2019's tenses align with the aforementioned attributive suffixes, sentences they analyze as "Tense-Type 2 Suffix" sequences are often analyzed as non-canonical endings with a "Canonical ending-Attributive-Bound noun" composition by Kim Jee-hong. Many of Yang C., Yang S., and O'Grady 2019's Type 1 suffixes are also interpreted as polymorphemic non-canonical endings. Kim Jee-hong also segments some of Yang C., Yang S., and O'Grady 2019's mixed-type suffixes so that the base form of the suffix includes the -n of the latter's non-past tense marker.

Examples from Kim Jee-hong 2015's analysis, directly corresponding to the examples above of Yang C., Yang S., and O'Grady 2019, are given below. The "default ender" -eo is bolded.

그 낭 다 컷어라.
geu nang da k-eos-**eo**-ra
MED tree all grow-PFV-CE-CE
"[I noticed that] that tree had fully grown."

지금도 고완게.
jigeum-do gow-**a**-n-ge
now-too be.pretty-CE-ATTR-thing
"[I saw that s/he] was still pretty."

==== Sentence enders ====
Jeju has a number of clause-final suffixes, called "sentence enders" in Yang C., Yang S., and O'Grady 2019 and "terminal suffixes" (종결어미; jonggyeol eomi) in Korean, that provide information such as degree of formality, social status, evidentality, and modality. Sentence enders may consist of one or multiple morphemes. Kim Jee-hong argues for four speech levels in Jeju, defined by the degree of formality and deference their sentence enders connote: informal and plain (non-honorific); formal and plain; informal and honorific, marked by the morpheme 우 -u-, and formal and honorific, featuring the morpheme 읍 -eup. An archaic speech level showing extreme deference is attested from shamanic chants.

As different segmentation hypotheses produce different sentence enders. the chart below will list only a small, illustrative sample of the dozens of suffixes that appear in Yang C., Yang S., and O'Grady 2019 and Kim Jee-h. 2015. The classification is based on Kim Jee-hong 2017, which differs from Kim Jee-hong 2015. (Note: Kim Jee-hong 2015 classifies all endings that can be followed by the deferential marker massim as informal, but Kim Jee-hong 2017 does so only for non-canonical endings.)

Informal and plain
Morpheme (Note: Initial vowel -eu- is always epenthetical in these examples.)		Example (Note: Parentheses mark differences in segmentation between Yang C., Yang S., and O'Grady 2019 and Kim Jee-hong. Notably, Kim Jee-hong does not analyze the vowel -i- following aspect markers as an epenthetical vowel but as a separate morpheme.)	Usage	Sources
어/아	-eo/a (Note: Vowel harmony)	가이 고와? gai gow-**a** "Is s/he pretty?"	Kim Jee-hong considers -eo the unmarked sentence ender. Depending on suprasegmentals, the suffix may be used in a plain statement, a question, a command, an exclamation, or a construction in which the speaker informs the addressee of information that the latter did not know and expects a confirmatory response. The suffix is also found in Standard Korean with a similar degree of versatility and widespread use.	
(으)주	-(eu)ju	만수 말 잘 ᄀᆞᆮ주. Mansu mal jal gawd-**ju** "Mansu talks well."	According to Kim Jee-hong, -ju conveys a statement of presumption or assumption without direct supporting experience, and invites the addressee to confirm the statement's veracity. Kim also states that -ju may end a confirmatory question with the implication that the addressee should agree with the speaker. According to Yang C., Yang S., and O'Grady, -ju expresses a statement of intention or strong assertion with a first-person subject and a statement of judgement or assumption with a third-person subject, and may also convey regret or advice.	
(은)게	(-eun)-ge	날 우쳣인게. nal uchy-eos-i(-)**n-ge** "[I see that] the day was cloudy."	(-eun)-ge generally conveys a statement of fact that the speaker has directly observed, or has inferred from a direct observation. In Yang C., Yang S., and O'Grady 2019, the suffix is given as -ge, a special Type 2 suffix which can only combine with the two tense markers ending in -n. Kim Jee-hong classifies it as a non-canonical ending composed of a fused attributive -eun and bound noun.	
(으)멘	(-eu)men	느 무시거 시치멘? neu musigeo sichi-**men** "What are you washing?"	(-eu)men is used for both statements and questions, but only when the speaker and addressee are emotionally intimate. When the verb is inflected for aspect, (-eu)men is used to refer to a past event that was observed or inferred from observation. If uninflected, the suffix denotes an ongoing event.	

Formal and plain
Morpheme		Example	Usage	Sources
다	-da	도새기 것 먹엇다. dosaegi geot meog-eot-**da** "The pig ate the fodder."	Unmarked formal statement ender. Dictionary citation form.	
(으)저	-(eu)jeo	하르방 몸 ᄀᆞᆷ앗저. hareubang mom gawm-at-**jeo** "Grandfather took a bath."	-jeo expresses a factual statement with the premise that the addressee is unaware of the fact, and may implicitly either urge the addressee to accept this new information or rebuke the addressee for not having known it. With a first-person subject, -jeo conveys the speaker's intention to do something. Whether these two uses of -jeo are connected uses of the same morpheme, or whether they are two different homophonous morphemes, is disputed.	
나	-na	이 풀 사름덜이 먹나. i pul sareum-deor-i meong-**na** this plant person-PL-NOM eat-**na** "This plant is edible."	Expresses a statement of fact with the implication that it is an intrinsic or permanent quality or state; commonly found with proverbs and aphorisms. -na is also used to ask questions about facts (including non-permanent facts), where it has a "somewhat authoritative tone". As with -jeo, whether these two uses reflect the same morpheme or two homophonous ones is disputed.	
고나	-gona	이디 물 새라낫고나! i-di mul saer-a-na-t-**gona** "The water had leaked here!"	Expresses a statement of surprise or excitement. Yang C., Yang S., and O'Grady 2019 gives the suffix as 구나 -guna instead. Kim Jee-hong reports that the suffix can be shortened to a single syllable 고 -go.	
가 은가	-ga (-eu)n-ga	그듸 무사 ᄃᆞᆺ앗인가? geu-di musa daws-as-i(-)**n-ga** "Why is that place warm?"	Conveys a question directed to the addressee. Yang C., Yang S., and O'Grady 2019 analyzes the suffixes as Type 2 ender -ga, with -n-ga not a genuine ending but -ga following a tense marker ending in -n. Kim Jee-hong distinguishes the canonical ending -ga with the non-canonical -eun-ga, which is analyzed as having a fused attributive.	
은고	(-eu)n-go	선싕 무시거 테왓인고? seonsing musigeo tew-as-i(-)**n-go** "I wonder what the teacher distributed."	Has a conjectural connotation. Often used in questions addressed to oneself, and is less direct than -eun-ga when asked to the addressee. Yang C., Yang S., and O'Grady 2019 analyzes the suffix as mixed type ender -go, with -eun-go being -go preceded by the non-past tense marker (and gaining this conjectural meaning only in the presence of the non-past tense marker). Kim Jee-hong analyzes it as a non-canonical ending with a fused attributive.	
디아	-dia	는 무사 얼언디아? neu-n musa eor-eo(-)n-**dia** "Why are you cold?"	Used to ask a question about which the addressee has direct relevant experience. In most cases the addressee is the subject of the verb, although third-person subjects have been attested. Appears in Kim Jee-hong's work in the contracted form 댜 -dya.	
(으)게	-(eu)ge	먹엇이게! meog-eos-**i(-)ge** "Let's get finished eating!"	Used in propositions (not commands as in Standard Korean).	
(으)라	-(eu)ra	먹으라! meog-**eura** "Eat!"	Used to command immediate action.	
(으)심 (으)순	-(eu)sim -(eu)sun	ᄌᆞ미나게 놀순! jawmi-na-ge nol-**sun** "Have fun!"	Used by older women when talking to younger adults not old enough for honorifics and not young or emotionally close enough for informal speech. May convey statements, questions, requests, and proposals.	

The honorific verbs, which show deference to the addressee, are formed by a special suffix that can be followed only by a small number of sentence enders.

The informal honorific forms are marked by 우 -u- or (으)우 -(eu)u-. The former is used with the copula verb 이다 ida and with all inflected verbs, and the latter is used with uninflected adjectival verbs. -u- and -(eu)u- may take the alternative form 수 -su- after a verb inflected for aspect and a non-liquid consonant, respectively. The informal honorific form cannot occur with uninflected action verbs. The two suffixes may only be followed by the sentence enders in the table below. Informal honorific requests cannot be formed morphologically.

Honorific	Sentence ender	Example	Usage
(으)우 -(eu)u-	다 -da	물 질엇우다. mul jil-eos-**u-da** "S/he drew water."	Used for statements.
(으)우 -(eu)u-	게 -ge 궤 -gwe	ᄎᆞᆯ레 멩글앗우게. chawlle menggeul-as-**u-ge** "I have made side dishes."	Used to report new information; restricted to inflected verbs.
(으)우 -(eu)u-	꿰 -kkwe	짚우우꿰. jip-**uu-kkwe** "It is deep."	Used to report new information or an opinion; restricted to uninflected verbs.
(으)우 -(eu)u-	가/강 -ga(ng) 과/광 -gwa(ng) 꽈/꽝 -kkwa(ng)	ᄃᆞᆨ세기 데끼쿠과? dawk-segi dekki-k-**u-gwa** "Will you throw away the eggs?"	Used in questions. -gwa(ng) is generally restricted to inflected verbs. Due to sound symbolism, the tense endings are considered emphatic.

The formal honorific forms involve the honorific marker 읍 -(eu)p- followed by one or two morphemes. Only the six following formal honorific forms are possible.

Honorific	Evidential	Sentence ender	Example	Usage
읍 -(eu)p-	네/니 -ne/ni	다 -da	그 신 만수신디 족읍네다. geu sin Mansu-sindi jog-**eup-ne-da** "[I know] those shoes must be small for Mansu."	A formal statement founded on prior knowledge, e.g. of Mansu's foot size. Implies that the rationale for the statement continues in the present and may be shared or experienced by the addressee.
읍 -(eu)p-	네/니 -ne/ni	까/깡 -kka(ng)	나가 ᄆᆞᆫ처 앚입네까? na-ga mawncheo aj-**ip-ne-kka** "Should I sit first?"	A formal question that the addressee is expected to be able to answer without direct observation.
읍 -(eu)p-	데/디 -de/di	다 -da	그 신 만수신디 족읍데다. geu sin Mansu-sindi jog-**eup-de-da** "[I saw] those shoes were small for Mansu."	A formal statement motivated by a direct, external past observation that cannot be experienced firsthand by the addressee. As the observation must be external, the first-person singular subject is prohibited except in highly atypical situations such as dissociation.
읍 -(eu)p-	데/디 -de/di	가/강 -ga(ng)	날이 얼큽디가? nal-i eol-k(-)**eu(-)p-di-ga** "[Based on your observation,] will the day be cold?"	A formal question that the addressee is expected to answer based on a past observation relating to a third party.
읍 -(eu)p-	—N/a	서 -seo	이거 먹읍서. i-geo meog-**eup-seo** "Please eat this."	A formal request.
읍 -(eu)p-	—N/a	주 -ju	지슬 줏입주. jiseul jus-**ip-ju** "Let's gather the potatoes."	Expresses speaker's intention with a first-person subject and advice or judgment otherwise; widely used for suggestions and propositions.

==== Connectives ====
Jeju uses an array of verb-final connective suffixes to link clauses within sentences, much as English does with conjunctions such as and, or, that, but, and because.

Some Jeju connectives, such as the suffixes 언/엉 -eon/eong "and", occur in pairs with one variant ending in -n and the other in -ng. Hong Chong-rim and Song Sang-jo both note that the choice between -n and -ng is often determined by the inflections of the subsequent clause; certain pre-final suffixes and sentence enders require a n-connective in the previous clause, while others require a ng-connective. Hong suggests that -n is used for specific and objective events and states, while -ng implies a general and subjective event or state. Song argues that -n is used for completed or achieved verbs, and -ng for incomplete or unachieved verbs. The nuances below are thus possible.

먹**언** 가민
meog-**eon** ga-min
eat-CONN go-COND
"Having eaten, if [I] go"

먹**엉** 가민
meog-**eong** ga-min
eat-CONN go-COND
"If [I] eat and [then] go"

오늘 비 오**란** 일 못 ᄒᆞᆫ다
oneul bi o-**ran** il mot haw-n-da
today rain come-CONN work cannot do-NPST-SE
"It's raining, so [we] can't work"

오늘 비 오**랑** 일 못 ᄒᆞᆫ다
oneul bi o-**rang** il mot haw-n-da
today rain come-CONN work cannot do-NPST-SE
"[I presume that] it's raining/going to rain, so [we] can't work"

The distinction between -n and -ng does not exist in mainland Korean varieties. Yang C., Yang S., and O'Grady 2019 reports that "the contrast between -eong and -eon appears to be disappearing, and the distinctions that remain are subtle and variable."

An important class of connectives, used for reporting speech and thoughts, is formed by the suffix 엔/엥 -en/-eng, which fuses with sentence enders as in the example of -da below.

"가ᇝ우**다**." (Note: 감/감수 instead of government-orthography 가ᇝ/가ᇝ우 in original source)
ga-ms-su-**da**
go-CONT-HON-SE
"'I am going.'"

가ᇝ**덴** ᄀᆞᆯ앗수다.
ga-ms-**den** gawr-at-su-da
go-CONT-REP say-PFV-HON-SE
"[S/he] said that [s/he] was going."

Similarly, informal honorific conjectural k-u-da becomes 켄 -ken; plain forms -ju and -jeo become 젠 -jen; question enders -ga and -go become 겐 -gen and 곤 -gon; honorific imperative -eup-seo becomes 읍센 -eup-sen; and so forth. These fused suffixes may be used for both quotative and reportive purposes. In Standard Korean, indirect speech is strictly distinguished from the quotative by the removal of addressee honorifics and the switching of pronouns. In Jeju, the lines between direct and indirect speech are more blurred. All four forms below—given in order of increasing indirectness—are in use, and have the same meaning, "He said [to a superior] that he was going home."

"난 집이 가ᇝ우다"엔 ᄀᆞᆯ앗수다.
na-n jib-i ga-ms-u-da-en gawr-at-su-da
1SG-TOP house-LOC go-CONT-HON-SE-QUOT say-PFV-HON-SE

난 집이 가ᇝ우덴 ᄀᆞᆯ앗수다.
na-n jib-i ga-ms-u-den gawr-at-su-da
1SG-TOP house-LOC go-CONT-HON-REP say-PFV-HON-SE

진 집이 가ᇝ우덴 ᄀᆞᆯ앗수다.
ji-n jib-i ga-ms-u-den gawr-at-su-da
3SG-TOP house-LOC go-CONT-HON-REP say-PFV-HON-SE

진 집이 가ᇝ덴 ᄀᆞᆯ앗수다.
ji-n jib-i ga-ms-den gawr-at-su-da
3SG-TOP house-LOC go-CONT-REP say-PFV-HON-SE

Other connectives include (으)민 -(eu)min "if"; (으)난 -(eu)nan "because"; and 단/당 -dan/dang "after".

==== Auxiliary and light verbs ====
Jeju has many auxiliary verbs that are linked to the preceding main verb by the morpheme 어/아 -eo/a. These include 안네다 anneda "to give", for an action that benefits a superior; 불다 bulda "to throw away", for an action yielding a complete result; and 지다 jida "to become", for a change of state. Jida is also used to indicate ability.

일 하영 헤노난 죽어지켜.
il hayeong he-nonan jug-eo-ji-k-yeo
work a.lot do-because die-eo-become-PROSP-SE
"I will become close to dying because I work a lot."

Jeju also uses light verbs, which have little semantic meaning but combine with nouns to form verbs. The most common light verb is ᄒᆞ다 hawda "to do", e.g. 부름씨 bureumssi "errand" → 부름씨ᄒᆞ다 bureumssi-hawda "to run an errand". There is also a large inventory of periphrastic phrases that convey modality.

=== Post-phrasal particles ===
Jeju has a small group of particles that commonly occur at the very end of phrases or sentences, many of which play important roles as discourse markers. The four principal ones are the formality marker 마씀 -masseum and the emphatic markers 게 -ge, 이 -i, and 양 -yang.

-masseum (variants 마씸 -massim, 마씨 -massi) may occur after subsentential phrases such as a bare or case-inflected noun, or attach to a small number of mostly plain sentence enders. The particle shows the speaker's deference towards the addressee, but is considered more emotionally intimate than the verbally inflected honorifics. In certain contexts, -masseum may be used with an intention to snub the addressee.

-ge is a discourse marker that attaches to adverbs, nouns and noun particles, and both sentence enders and connectives. It adds emphasis to the utterance and is often used to agree with or confirm something the addressee has just said. -i is used similarly to -ge, but is weaker in its emphasis. Both cannot be used while addressing a social superior, and -i also cannot appear in formal speech. Both particles can also appear in isolation: ge as a strong affirmation to a question, i as an indication that the speaker has not heard or does not believe what has been said.

-yang shows deference, but is considered more informal than -masseum. At the end of a sentence, it emphasizes the speaker's beliefs or attitudes. For example, a question becomes a rhetorical one when -yang is attached: 이시카 is-ik-a "Could there be?" → 이시카양 is-ik-a-yang "How could there be?" The particle is also commonly used for sarcastic mock deference, such as by parents while scolding children. Sentence-initially or internally, the suffix may establish the preceding element as the topic of discourse. Yang is also used in isolation as an interjection to get the attention of unfamiliar individuals, such as a shopkeeper, or to request the addressee to repeat what they have just said.

In the example below from Yang C. 2009, three of the four particles discussed above are used.

Granddaughter:	할마니, 이디가 말로만 들어난 모슬포우꽈? halmani, idi-ga mal-loman deureo-nan Moseulpo-ukkwa? "Grandmother, is this place Moseulpo, which I've only heard of?"
Grandmother:	ᄋᆞ 맞다**게**, 이디가 모슬포여. aw matda-**ge**, idi-ga Moseulpo-yeo. "Yes, you're **indeed** correct, this place is Moseulpo."
Granddaughter:	모슬포**양**... 게민 어떵허연 모슬포옌 ᄒᆞ엿인신고**마씸**? ᄒᆞᆨ교에서 숙제 내연**마씸**. Moseulpo-**yang**... gemin eotteong-heoyeon Moseulpo-yen hawyeosinsingo-**massim**? hawkgyo-eseo sukje naeyeon-**massim**. "Moseulpo, **right**... So why do they call it Moseulpo, **please**? They gave us an assignment at school, **please**."

Note the granddaughter's use of the verbally inflected honorific -u- and the deference-marking massim and yang while addressing the grandmother.

=== Pronouns and deixis ===
Jeju has the following basic personal pronouns.

	Singular	Plural	Usage
1st person	나/내 na/nae "I; me"	우리(덜) uri(-deol) "we; us"	
2nd person	느/니 neu/ni "you (s.)"	느네(덜) neu-ne-(deol) "you (pl.)"	For younger, emotionally intimate, or socially inferior individuals
2nd person	지 ji "you (s.)"	지네(덜) ji-ne(-deol) "you (pl.)"	For younger individuals, but more respectful than neu/ni
2nd person	No overt pronoun		For older individuals
3rd person	None per se. Informally, demonstratives used before 아의 ai: 가이 gai "him/her" (lit. 'that person'), etc.		

According to Yang C., Yang S., and O'Grady 2019, there are four basic deictic demonstratives in Jeju. Most other sources mention three, which are identical to those of Standard Korean.

- Proximal: 이 i "this"
- Medial or absent: 그 geu "that"
- Distal: 저 jeo "that"

== Vocabulary ==
Most of the Jeju lexicon is Koreanic, and "a sizeable number" of words are identical with Korean. There are false friends between the languages, such as Korean 감다 gamda "to wash hair" and Jeju ᄀᆞᆷ다 gawmda "to wash the body". Jeju also preserves many Middle Korean terms now lost in Korean, such as 갓 gat "wife; woman" and 어시 eosi "parent". Like Korean, Jeju uses many Sino-Korean words based on local readings of Classical Chinese.

Jeju Island was ruled by the Mongols in the late thirteenth century and some Middle Mongol terms still survive in the language, though the extent of Mongol influence is disputed. Popular claims of hundreds of Mongol loans in Jeju are linguistically unsound. Uncontroversial Mongol loans are most common in terms relating to animal husbandry.

English	Jeju	Middle Mongol
bridle	가달 gadal	qada'ar
halter	녹대 nokdae	noγta
two-year-old cattle	다간 dagan	daγaγan "two-year-old horse"
classifier for houses	거리 geori	ger "house"

Jeju may have loans from an ancient Japonic substratum. As the last fluent generation of Jeju speakers were born under or shortly after Japanese rule, remaining speakers also use many loans from Modern Japanese.

English	Jeju	Japanese
noisy	우르사이 ureusai	うるさい urusai
chopsticks	하시 hasi	箸 hashi
habit	쿠세 kuse	癖 kuse

=== Sound symbolism ===
Jeju has widespread sound symbolism in ideophones. The use of sound symbolism to form emphatic variants of words is more common in Jeju than in Seoul Korean.

Jeju sound symbolism operates with both consonants and vowels. The intensity of a Jeju word may be strengthened by using tense and especially aspirate obstruents. The sound symbolism may also be emphasized through the addition of consonants, by adding the sequence -락 -rak to both reduplicated segments, and with fortition or lenition. The yang harmonic class of vowels has a bright, small connotation, and the yin vowel class gives a dark, large connotation. Ko Jae-hwan also gives examples of three or four layers of vowel sound symbolism.

- Consonant sound symbolism:
  - 고시롱 gosirong "savory" → 꼬시롱 kkosirong "[very] savory" → 코시롱 kosirong "[extremely] savory"
  - 을강을강 eulgang-eulgang "[small] sound of rat gnawing teeth" → 글강글강 geulgang-geulgang "[large] sound of rat gnawing teeth"
  - ᄇᆞᆯ착ᄇᆞᆯ착 bawlchak-bawlchak "easily angered" → ᄇᆞᆯ치락ᄇᆞᆯ치락 bawlchirak-bawlchirak "[very] easily angered"
  - 크뜽크뜽 keutteung-keutteung "neatly aligned" → 코찡코찡 kojjing-kojjing "[very] neatly aligned" (Note: Given with 크 keu, 코 ko in Kang S. 2008, but both forms given with ᄏᆞ kaw in the 2009 Dictionary of the Jeju Language)
- Vowel sound symbolism:
  - 동골동골 donggol-donggol "round [of a small object]" → 둥굴둥굴 dunggul-dunggul "round [of a large object]"
  - ᄋᆞᆼ당ᄋᆞᆼ당 awngdang-awngdang "[small and light] sound of muttered complaints" → 옹당옹당 ongdang-ongdang "[large and heavy] sound of muttered complaints" → 웅당웅당 ungdang-ungdang "[very large and very heavy] sound of muttered complaints"
  - ᄆᆞᆫ들ᄆᆞᆫ들 mawndeul-mawndeul "smooth to the touch [of a very small or dry object]" → 맨들맨들 maendeul-maendeul "smooth to the touch [of a somewhat small or dry object]" → 문들문들 mundeul-mundeul "slippery to the touch [of a somewhat large or wet object]" → 민들민들 mindeul-mindeul "slippery to the touch [of a very large or wet object]"

Multiple sound-symbolic strategies may combine in a single word. Kang S. 2008 gives eight sound symbolic variants of the ideophone ᄆᆞᆯ탁ᄆᆞᆯ탁 mawltak-mawltak "the shape of many objects being blunt", each more intense than the other:

ᄆᆞᆯ탁ᄆᆞᆯ탁 mawltak-mawltak → ᄆᆞᆯ트락ᄆᆞᆯ트락 mawlteurak-mawlteurak → ᄆᆞᆯ착ᄆᆞᆯ착 mawlchak-mawlchak → ᄆᆞᆯ치락ᄆᆞᆯ치락 mawlchirak-mawlchirak → 뫁탁몰탁 moltak-moltak → 몰착몰착 molchak-molchak → 몰트락몰트락 molteurak-molteurak → 몰치락몰치락 molchirak-molchirak

=== Kinship terminology ===
The kinship terminology of Jeju has been the focus of particular attention. Jeju has a complex kinship system that distinguishes the gender of both the speaker and the relative. Gender distinctions are particularly noticeable in sibling terminology. The words 성 seong and 아시 asi refer to "older same-gender sibling" and "younger same-gender sibling" respectively, while 오라방 orabang and 누이 nui refer specifically to "brother of a female" and "sister of a male" respectively. Female speakers also tend to refer to relatives with native compounds, whereas male speakers prefer Sino-Korean terms. For instance, the same cousin may be referred to by a man as ᄉᆞ춘 sawchun "cousin" but by a woman as 고모님 ᄄᆞᆯ gomo-nim ttawl "paternal aunt's daughter." A major distinction between Jeju and Korean kinship terms is that women do not use honorifics to refer to their in-laws, reflecting weaker historical influence from Confucian patriarchal norms.

Jeju also uses supplementary prefixes to clarify the type of kinship, equivalent to "step-" or "maternal" in English. These include 친- chin-, 성- seong-, and 당- dang- for paternal relations, 웨- we- for maternal relations, 다슴- daseum- for step-relations, 처- cheo- and 가시- gasi- for a male's in-laws, and 시- si- for a woman's in-laws. Five other prefixes, which may be combined, mark relative age: 쳇- chet- or 큰- keun- "eldest", 셋- set- "second eldest of three or more", 말젯- maljet- "third eldest of four or more", and 족은- jogeun- "youngest". These are used to distinguish relatives of the same generation.

- 하르방 hareubang "grandfather"
  - 큰하르방 keun-hareubang "oldest brother of one's grandfather"
  - 셋하르방 set-hareubang "second brother of one's grandfather"
  - 큰말젯하르방 keun-maljet-hareubang "third brother of one's grandfather"
  - 셋말젯하르방 set-maljet-hareubang "fourth brother of one's grandfather"
  - 족은말젯하르방 jogeun-maljet-hareubang "fifth brother of one's grandfather"
  - 족은하르방 jogeun-hareubang "youngest brother of one's grandfather"

Other prefixes include 왕- wang-, used in 왕하르방 wang-hareubang "great-grandfather", and 넛- neot-, used to refer to a sibling of one's grandparent generally.

== Sample text ==
The following is an excerpt from a version of the Menggam bon-puri, one of the epic chants recited by Jeju shamans. In this narrative, the poacher Song Saman discovers an abandoned skull in the hills and cares for it as if it were his own ancestor. The skull reciprocates by warning Song Saman of his early death and advising him on how to avoid the chasa, the three gods of death.

This version was transcribed between 1956 and 1963 from the recitation of the shaman Byeon Sin-saeng, born c. 1904. The transcription predates both standardized orthographies of Jeju. The transcriber openly notes that the orthography is inconsistent. No attempt was made in this article to standardize or update the orthography.

Jeju original	Korean translation (Note: Based on glosses and cognates of Jeju provided in Chin S. 1991; Chin gives one-to-one definitions or Standard Korean cognates of most Jeju terms not immediately identifiable by a Korean speaker, but does not actually translate the text into fluent Standard Korean)
"느 송ᄉᆞ만이 전맹이 ᄀᆞᆺ 서른이 매기난, 서른 나는 해에 아무ᄃᆞᆯ 아무날은 맹이 매기니 느가 발 살앙 오몽ᄒᆞ여질 때, 나를 낭곳으로 ᄀᆞ져다 도라... 시 ᄆᆞ슬 강 심방 시 개 걷우우곡 마당이 큰대 세왕 두 일회 열나을 굿을 ᄒᆞ라..." 맷딱 ᄎᆞᆯ려놓완 백보 밲겼딜로 간 절을 ᄒᆞ연, ᄀᆞ만이 꿀련 업더져두서 보난 삼체ᄉᆞ가 ᄂᆞ려오멍... "송ᄉᆞ만이네 집이서 정성을 아니드렴신가?" 말자이 오는 체ᄉᆞᆫ "송ᄉᆞ만이네 집이 백년대강이를 모삼따. 그 백년대강이가 송ᄉᆞ만이 심으레 오람센 ᄀᆞᆯ아분 생이여... 받음은 받았주마는 심엉 오랜 ᄒᆞᆫ 시간이 시여부난 어떵흘코?"	"너 송사만이는 겨우 서른이 수명의 끝이니, 서른 되는 해에는 아무 달 아무 날에 명이 끝날 테이므로 너가 발이 살아서 움직일 수 있을 때 나를 나무숲으로 데려다 달라... 마을 세 곳에 가서 무당 세 명을 모으고 마당에 큰 깃대 세워서 두 이레 열나흘 굿[제주 큰굿]을 하라..." 다 차려놓은 체 백보 바깥으로 가 절하며 가만히 무릎 꿇고 업드리고 보니까, 삼차사가 내려오면서... "송사만이네 집에서 정성을 드리고 있는 것 아닌가?" 나중에 오는 차사는, "송사만이네 집에서 백년 된 해골을 모시고 있다. 그 백년 된 해골이 송사만이 잡으러 오고 있다고 말해버린 모양이야... 준 건 받았지만 잡아 오라고 한 마감이 있는데 어떻게 할까?"
Romanization (Note: Nouns are hyphenated from their particles, and compounds are hyphenated between their components, but the verbal morphology is not hyphenated.)
neu Song Sawman-i jeonmaeng-i gawt seoreun-i maeg-inan, seoreun naneun hae-e amu dawl amu nar-eun maeng-i maeg-ini neu-ga bal sarang omong-hawyeo-jil ttae, na-reul nang-gos-euro gawjyeoda dora... si mawseul gang simbang si gae geoduugok madang-i keun dae sewang du ilhwe yeol-naeul gus-eul hawra... maetttak chawllyeo-nowan baekbo baekgyeot-dillo gan jeor-eul hawyeon, gawmani kkulyeon eopdeojyeo-duseo bonan samchesaw-ga nawryeo-omeong... "Song Sawman-i-ne jib-iseo jeongseong-eul ani deuryeomsin'ga?" Maljai oneun chesaw-n "Song Sawman-i-ne jib-i baengnyeon-daegang'i-reul mosamtta. geu baengnyeon-daegang'i-ga Song Sawman-i simeure oramsen gawra-bun saeng-iyeo... badeum-eun badat-jumaneun simeong oraen hawn sigan-i siyeo-bunan eotteong-heulko?"
English
"You, Song Saman, your life will end at only thirty, and the year you turn thirty, your life will end at any day of any month, so take me to the wooded forest while your feet are still alive and you can move... Go to three villages and gather three shamans and raise a great flagstaff in the household hall, and hold the Great Gut [lit. 'the gut of two weeks and fourteen days']..." Once they laid out everything, [Song Sawman and his wife] went back a hundred steps and prostrated themselves. Quietly kneeling and lying prone, they saw the three chasa descend... "Are they not doing devotional acts at Song Saman's household?" The chasa coming in last [responded], "At Song Saman's household, they are worshipping a hundred-year-old skull. It seems that the hundred-year-old skull told [them] that we were coming to capture Song Sawman... We have partaken of the offerings [lit. 'received what is received'], but there is a date that they told us to capture him by, so what should we do?"

== See also ==
- Bon-puri, Jeju-language narrative poems explaining the origins of deities.
