= Gangnim Doryeong =

Legendary figure in Korean mythology

- Member of Jeoseung Sajas
- Other names: Ganglim Doryeong; Gangrim Doryeong; Gangrim Chasa; Ganglim Chasa; Gangnim Chasa
- Hangul: 강림도령
- Affiliation: Jeoseung Sajas
- Abode: Netherworld
- Artifacts: Jeokpaeji
- Gender: Male
- Region: Korea
- Ethnic group: Koreans
- Associated deities: Yeomra Daewang

Gangnim Doryeong (Korean: 강림도령; Hanja: 降臨道令) or Gangnim Chasa (Korean: 강림차사; Hanja: 降臨差使) is one of the Jeoseung Saja, the psychopomps of Korean mythology. He is known as the most famous Jeoseung Saja in Korea and is regarded as the representative figure of the Jeoseung Saja.

His role is to guide the souls of the dead to the entrance of the afterlife. According to legend, he always carries Jeokpaeji (Korean: 적패지; Hanja: 赤牌旨), the list with the names of the dead written on a red cloth. Gangnim Doryeong first seeks permission from the village deity to claim the deceased. After that, When he calls the name of Jeokpaeji three times, the soul leaves the body and follows him inevitably.

Gangnim Doryeong appears in the Chasa bon-puri of Jeju Island, the Jinja Gangmuga of Hamgyeong Province, and various other Korean shamanic narratives.

== Name ==
Gangnim Doryeong is a compound word formed by combining Gangnim (강림; 降臨) and Doryeong (도령; 道令). Gangnim means advent, Doryeong means a young bachelor.

== Mythology ==
=== Chasa bon-puri ===
The Chasa bon-puri recounts the birth of Gangnim Doryeong and how he became Jeoseung Saja. Like all oral myths, there are multiple versions of the Chasa Bonpuli.

Two other stories concerning Gangnim after he became a god also appears in the Chasa Bon-puri.

1. Gangnim had the mission to capture Samani, who had bribed Haewonmaek to live for 40,000 years. (See Menggam bon-puri myth) Gangnim knelt down and began to wash charcoal on a river. When people asked him why he was doing that, Gangnim answered that it was because the charcoal would turn white if he washed it for a hundred years. One day, an old man laughed at Gangnim's explanation and said; "I have lived for 40,000 years, yet I have never heard such a thing." Gangnim then caught Samani and brought him to the Underworld, where he, too, became a god.
2. Gangnim had to reap the dead when a man was 70 years old, and when a woman was 80 years old. One day, Gangnim asked a crow to reap the souls for him. The crow took the book that had the lifespans of the dead. When the crow saw a dead horse lying on the road, it dropped the book to eat the horse meat. A rat snake crawled out and ate the book. From then on, the snake had the privilege of dying eight times, and yet being reborn eight times. When the crow noticed the book was gone, it blamed a hawk on a nearby tree. The hawk and crow fought viciously, and still do to this day. The crow finally cried out; "Parents, die when your children do. Children, die when your parents do. Men, die when your wives do. Women, die when your husbands do." When Gangnim discovered that the crow had lost the book, he crushed its legs, which is why crows have bent legs.

=== Other myths ===
Gangnim appears in the Menggam Bonpuli, where he captures Samani (see above) He also appears in the Hwangcheon Honshi myth, where there are four reaping gods; "Gangnim the Child" (Gangnim Doryeong), "Gangnim the Reaper" (Gangnim Chasa), "Death Reaper"(Jeoseung Chasa), and "Mortal Reaper" (Iseung Chasa).

In Jeju Island, Gangnim is said to first earn permission from the village god for him to reap the dead. He then reads the name of the reaped thrice from Jeokpaeji (적패지), a book with red paper and white ink, and guides the dead to the Underworld.

Gangnim also appears in many folk songs. Below is an excerpt of the Mozzineun Norae song;

"Jeoseung Chaesa Gangnim Doryeong Iseung Chaesa Yi Myengseoni Hutcheogaso Hutcheogaso Yi Motjari Hutcheogaso" (Death Reaper Gangnim Doryeong, Mortal Reaper Yi Myeongseoni, take this take this take this paddy)

This song was sung when replanting rice shoots in the ground. This song admits 'Gangnim Doryeong' and 'Yi Myeongseoni' as two reaper gods. (Other Iseung Chasa are 'Yi Deokchun' and Yi Sammani'. The latter is said to protect from snake bites.)

== In popular culture ==
Gangnim Doryeong is a character in the Korean fantasy webtoon Along with the Gods and the films Along with the Gods: The Two Worlds and Along with the Gods: The Last 49 Days.

Gangnim Doryeong also appears in the South Korean animation Ghost Messenger.
