= Yincha =

Underworld messengers in Chinese folklore

Yincha (Chinese: 陰差; lit. 'underworld messenger'), also called guicha (鬼差; "ghost messenger"), are servants of the underworld in Chinese folk religion. They carry out orders from gods such as Yanluo Wang and the City God. Their main duty is to collect the souls of the dead and take them to the underworld for judgment.

== Roles and traditions ==
In Chinese folklore, the underworld has courts, officials, and guards, much like the government of the living world. Yincha work for these officials. They are sent to bring the souls of the dead before the judges of the underworld. Some stories also describe them carrying messages or arresting ghosts who have escaped.

Although yincha are often described as ghosts, some tales tell of living people who work for the underworld. These people are sometimes called zou wuchang (走無常). They may enter the underworld in their dreams or leave their bodies while asleep.

The term yincha also appears in the traditional beliefs of the Qiang people. In some Qiang communities, it is used for shamans who are believed to communicate with spirits. They are described as being in contact with the living world by day and the spirit world by night, or with the living while awake and the dead while dreaming.

== In literature ==
Chinese ghost stories often describe messengers who come to collect the souls of people about to die. Some are known as juhun gui (拘魂鬼; "soul-catching ghosts"). They are sometimes described as two men in purple clothing who look like ordinary people. They may carry documents with the names of the people they have come to collect. In some accounts, they call the dying person's name and bind the soul with a chain before taking it to the underworld.

A story in the Tang dynasty collection Youyang Zazu tells of a man named Li Hezi (李和子) who lived in Chang'an during the Yuanhe era (806–820). Li often stole and ate cats and dogs. One day, he met two men dressed in purple. They told him that they were ghosts sent by the underworld to arrest him. They showed him an official document stating that 460 cats and dogs had brought a case against him.

Li became frightened and offered them wine. The two ghosts agreed to help him and told him to prepare 400,000 coins in exchange for another three years of life. Li burned paper money as instructed and saw the ghosts take it away. However, he died three days later. The story explains that three years in the underworld were equal to three days in the human world.

Living messengers also appear in Qing dynasty ghost stories. In "Dreaming of Wolves" (夢狼), a story from Liaozhai Zhiyi by Pu Songling, a man named Ding works as a zou wuchang. He visits an old man named Bai and later takes him to another world in a dream. Bai sees his son living among wolves, who represent corrupt officials.

Another account appears in Yuewei Caotang Biji by Ji Yun. A traveler meets two men who are talking about the underworld. One can see ghosts, while the other works as a zou wuchang. The second man explains that he was taken to work for the underworld while dreaming, but does not know why he was chosen.

== In folk religion ==
Among the best-known underworld messengers are Heibai Wuchang, or Black and White Impermanence. In Taiwan, they are commonly known as Generals Xie and Fan, or the Seven Lord and Eight Lord (七爺八爺). They serve the City God and escort the souls of the dead to his court for judgment. Other underworld servants include Ox-Head and Horse-Face and Generals Chains and Shackles.

Statues of these figures are found in City God temples. At Taipei Xia-Hai City God Temple, Generals Xie and Fan stand beside the City God, along with the civil and military judges and Ox-Head and Horse-Face. The generals are believed to arrest wandering souls and bring them before the City God. Ox-Head and Horse-Face are sometimes described as guards of the underworld or of the Naihe Bridge.

The generals also appear in Taiwanese temple processions, including performances by Bajiajiang (八家將). The performers dress as underworld officers and wear painted faces, robes, and hats. They carry fans, tablets, and ritual weapons. In one traditional arrangement, Generals Fan and Xie arrest offenders, Generals Gan and Liu carry out punishments, and four other generals question them.

The worship of the Seven Lord and Eight Lord in Taiwan developed from traditions of Black and White Impermanence in Fujian. It may have reached Taiwan during the middle or late Qing dynasty. Their roles later grew beyond collecting souls. They also came to be worshipped as gods who drive away evil spirits and protect people from misfortune.

Similar underworld messengers appear in Korean shamanism. They are called Jeoseung Saja (저승사자) or chasa (차사). In some traditions, Gangrim (강림도령) is a leading messenger of the dead. These figures also appear in modern Korean fiction, including the manhwa Along with the Gods.

== See also ==
- Diyu
- Heibai Wuchang
- Ox-Head and Horse-Face
- Psychopomp
