= Chasa =

Chasa may refer to:

- Jeoseung Chasa
- Chasa bon-puri, a Korean myth
- Chasa (caste), a community in Odisha, India
