= Ghost Messenger =

- Poster of the 2014 movie version.
- Directed by: BongHue Gu
- Starring: EunJung, SungTae Park, JungHwa Yang, JaeHeon Jung, and more
- Music by: D.A. (JIMMie Park)
- Production company: STUDIO ANIMAL
- Release date: May 20, 2014
- Running time: 79 minutes
- Country: South Korea
- Language: Korean

Ghost Messenger (Korean: 고스트 메신저) is a South Korean aeni made by STUDIO ANIMAL.

First released in 2010, it revolves around a series of events that happen as Little Kanglim (voiced by EunJung), a human boy with extraordinary spiritual power, accidentally encounters ghost messenger Kanglim (voiced by SungTae Park).

It falls under the genres science fiction, fantasy, and supernatural, though STUDIO ANIMAL officially states its genre as 'Oriental SF Fantasy'.

== Synopsis ==
In the World of Death, beings beyond the sight of mortal humans use advanced technology to control the life and death of all living kind on Earth. When a mortal's time has come, their spirit is summoned to join the ranks of the Dead. Some restless spirits refuse to follow these orders and remain among the physical realm, and that's when the Ghost Messengers are called into action. Ghost Messengers are 'in-between' beings who can travel freely between the worlds of the dead and the living and are supplied with the technology to capture rogue spirits and bring them to the World of Death. While on a spirit-retrieval mission, Kang-Lim, a particularly powerful Ghost Messenger, mistakenly becomes trapped in his own Soul Phone – the device used by the Messengers to capture ghosts – and is discovered by a human boy with extraordinary psychic powers that allows him to see spirits. When an unknown force begins unleashing mythological demons to disrupt the strict balance of the lands of the dead and the living, a bond is formed between Kang-Lim and the human boy, known as 'Little Kang-Lim', and they join forces in an effort to retain order as the world becomes increasingly unstable.

== Characters ==
Little Kanglim (꼬마 강림)
Little Kanglim is a human child with extraordinary spiritual powers.
He runs an antique shop with his grandfather. He is able to see spirits but does not have the ability to stop them from doing harm. But after a Soul Phone comes into his hands, he starts to get involved with the fight.

Kanglim (강림 도령)
Kanglim is a Ghost Messenger with strong potential power.
He is in charge of Area 202 in Seoul. Burying the sad stories of his past, Kanglim became a Ghost Messenger after making a contract with Yumla. He has no interest in others, standing alone in the world. One day he accidentally gets captured in his own Soul Phone and encounters Little Kanglim. He is about to change.
Kanglim's Soul Phone is Black Shark. It has a memory capacity of 15 Dan, and can be transformed into a sword-like form. Black Shark is greatly efficient for one-on-one battles.

Bari (바리 낭자)
Bari is the head commander of Sesung Pyeonjeon and has gone through various positions of the Underworld.
She is a smart, brave girl and an excellent Ghost Messenger who always shows perfection on her mission. She has a crush on Kanglim, but in order not to reveal such feelings, she is colder to him than any other. But when Kanglim runs into trouble, she is the first person to stand up for him.
Bari's Soul Phone is Fan Crane. It is a smartphone with a huge memory capacity, and can be transformed to display things on a half transparent, fan-shaped screen. When in battle, Bari usually summons spirits using Fan Crane, rather than having herself fight.

Sara (사라 도령)
Sara is a Ghost Messenger who belongs to Seocheon Hwarang-bu.
Though he may seem cruel and merciless from the outside, he has a strong belief in the rules of the Underworld and keeps emotions out of the way while on his missions. Being unable to stand anything that is not beautiful, Sara has a sense of great self-respect. Surprisingly though, he also has a sensitive side.
Sara's Soul Phone is Guns N' Roses. It is a pair of Soul Phones that have a memory capacity of 42 Dan(combined, probably), and can be transformed into handguns. Specially-made bullets allow Sara to destroy the Marman of his targets quickly and effectively.

Mago (마고 할미)
Mago is a Ghost Messenger with smooth mellowness.
She was originally the goddess of life, but when she saw evil spirits killing so many precious lives, she decided to become a Ghost Messenger.
Mago's Soul Phone is Soul Wave. Its memory capacity is unknown, and can have the form of a long smoking pipe. Soul Wave allows Mago to access Yumla-net's main server directly.

== Cast ==
- Little Kanglim was voiced by EunJung
- Kanglim was voiced by SungTae Park
- Bari was voiced by JungHwa Yang
- Sara was voiced by JaeHeon Jung
- Mago was voiced by JiYun Park
- Little Kanglim's grandfather was voiced by ManYeong Park(in episode 1)/YongJun Kim(in episode 2 & the movie version)
- Daesu was voiced by BumKi Hong
- Monsters were voiced by YeongJun Shi, HoSung Kim, and KyuHyeok Shim
- Operators were voiced by EunJung
- Little Kanglim's friends (extras) were voiced by EunJung, SungTae Park, JungHwa Yang, JiHye Park, Jisu Kim, and EunSu Lee

== Theme ==
The theme of Ghost Messenger is "to cover, not too lightly nor too gravely, the (Korean) traditional aspect of death and how the living remembers and mourns the dead, and to think about how a boy would change while going through such situations." Accordingly, the world of Ghost Messenger is based upon the Korean traditional view of the afterlife.

== In other media ==
Many characters in Ghost Messenger are named after characters in Korean traditional folklore and more or less resemble them in some way, though more differences are noticeable than similarities. For example, Mago comes from the goddess Mago of Korean mythology. Yumla is based on Yeom-ra, while Kanglim has a connection to the main character of Chasa bon-puri, a myth about a Korean grim reaper. Though there is no apparent link yet, Bari has the same name with and is somehow related to the main character of the Korean myth Princess Bari, and Sara lightly references a character of Igong bon-puri with the same name.

The character Daesu has an origin too, but is not from folklore nor mythology: Daesu was based on STUDIO ANIMAL PD staff DaeSu Kim.

Not only does Ghost Messenger refer to various Korean traditional folklore and myths, but also refer to present-day streets and buildings of Seoul. Two famous tourist attractions, Myeongdong Theater and N Seoul Tower, appear in the opening sequence, and locations such as Anguk station or Samcheong-dong are mentioned in the series. However, due to the animation's production period and long terms between episodes, some scenes show shops and buildings that no longer exist; for example the original reference for the building where Kanglim's office is located was taken down even before the first episode was released.

According to the director, Ghost Messenger pays homage to some famous Japanese animations by lightly parodying certain scenes:

The Melancholy of Haruhi Suzumiya: Little Kanglim's seat in the classroom is intended to be the same spot as Haruhi's.

Princess Mononoke: When Kanglim is first released from the Soul Phone by Little Kanglim, one of Ashitaka's lines is referenced.

Fate/stay night: The poses and positions of Little Kanglim and Kanglim facing each other in a certain scene after the main battle with the dog spirits is a parody of Shirō facing Saber after he summons her.

Bakemonogatari: Daesu spilling paper advertisements from under his shirt is a parody of an illustration of Hitagi spilling school supplies from under her skirt.

Other than Japanese animations, Medical Island, a past work of STUDIO ANIMAL, is referenced by featuring two characters of the animation as extras.

== Production ==
Development

Back when smartphones weren't widely used, STUDIO ANIMAL planned Ghost Loader, a mobile TCG game in which players would fight by downloading digitized spirits to their phones. However, due to the circumstances at the time, the game ended up not being developed. 2 years later, when browsing various websites on KOCCA, STUDIO ANIMAL came to read information about various Korean traditional folklore and culture considering the underworld, and when the company combined Ghost Loader with Korean folklore, the concept of Ghost Messenger was born.

During the time when the title of Ghost Messenger wasn't decided between 저승사자 강림 (The Ghost Messenger KANG LIM) and the current title, STUDIO ANIMAL first made the 1st promotional video of Ghost Messenger. After the PV was made, a Spanish animation company, BRB Internacional, contacted STUDIO ANIMAL and planned to fund them for the production of Ghost Messenger as a TV series, but as BRB asked too much to be edited, the co-production deal between the two companies was broken. In this process though, Little Kanglim was created and set as a main character.

Due to the lack of money and considering the various limitations on Korean TV animations-such as those on violence-STUDIO ANIMAL decided to make Ghost Messenger as an OVA series. Currently episode 1 and 2 of the OVA have been successfully released.

However, in a 2019 article announcing its global distribution by Portfolio Entertainment, Ghost Messenger: MOVIE.1 has been mentioned as the first part of a trilogy, with each episode being in feature-length.

In a September 2020 interview done by Gyeonggi Content Agency, STUDIO ANIMAL officially mentioned that the third episode of Ghost Messenger has already been planned but said they wish to start production once a firm financial background is readied.

Sound Effects & Recording

The insertion and arrangement of sound effects and recording of voices were done by YeongBin Lee of Legend Sound.

Music

The overall background music for the first episode of the OVA was edited and/or replaced when it was combined with the second episode into the movie version.

The opening theme song is Connexion by Outsider.

The ending theme song is track 9 by So-ra Lee. It was selected as the ending theme song because the director of Ghost Messenger thought the lyrics' message, 'despite everything, live on', was in-line with the animation's theme and how Little Kanglim must experience inner growth as the story unravels.

Variations of just wanna (Original) by H. Matilda are often used related to the series, and My world (Original) by Jeebag is used in the first episode of the OVA.

Most songs, except for the ending theme, were composed by D.A. (JIMMie Park)

== Release ==
The DVD of the OVA's first episode was released on December 21, 2010.

The DVD of the OVA's second episode was released on August 19, 2014.

OVA episode 1 and 2 were combined and edited as a movie, 고스트 메신저 극장판 (Ghost Messenger: MOVIE.1). On May 22, 2014, it premiered in Lotte Cinema theaters, the Korean Manhwa Museum, and Seoul Animation Center. The official release date of the Blu-ray of this version is January 9, 2015.

A music album, 고스트메신저 OST part.1 ~ aspiration, was released online on July 1, 2011. It contained the following tracks:

01 Connexion (Original)
02 just wanna (Original)
03 just wanna (Remix)
04 My world (Original)
05 My world (Remix)
06 Connexion (Instrumental)

== Media mix ==
고스트 메신저 무제경전
- Cover of 고스트 메신저 무제경전
- Editor: STUDIO ANIMAL
- Author: JiYeon Kim, EunJi Yu
- Illustrator: Jinha
- Language: Korean
- Genre: Light novel
- Publisher: D&C Media
- Publication date: March 31, 2014
- Publication place: South Korea
- ISBN: 9788926783009

On March 31, 2014, a novel based on the series that tells what happened between OVA episode 1 and 2 was released: 고스트 메신저 무제경전. Published under the Korean light novel brand Seed Novel, the story revolves around a novel-original male shaman character named 상후(SangHu). Characters from the animation, mainly Little Kanglim and Kanglim, also appear and interfere with the novel's story.

고스트 메신저 일월차사전
- Icon of 고스트 메신저 일월차사전
- Publishers: TTU Soft.
- Publication: June 11, 2015
- Genres: TCG, Visual Novel
- Languages: Korean

On June 11, 2015, the mobile trading card game made by the collaboration of STUDIO ANIMAL and TTU Soft., 고스트 메신저 일월차사전, was released on Google Play. However, on September 18, 2016, the game officially went out of service due to issues of the game company. Set a few years after the animation's temporal background, the game mainly focused on what happened as the main character 지오(Jio), an original character that has not appeared in the animation nor the novel, became a ghost messenger after he suddenly died for an unknown reason. Some of the game's original characters had connections to Korean traditional folklore and myths, for example to Bihyeong, Igong bon-puri, Menggam bon-puri and Honswi-gut.

== See also ==
- South Korean animation
