= Jeoseung Saja =

Korean personification of death

- Messengers of Death
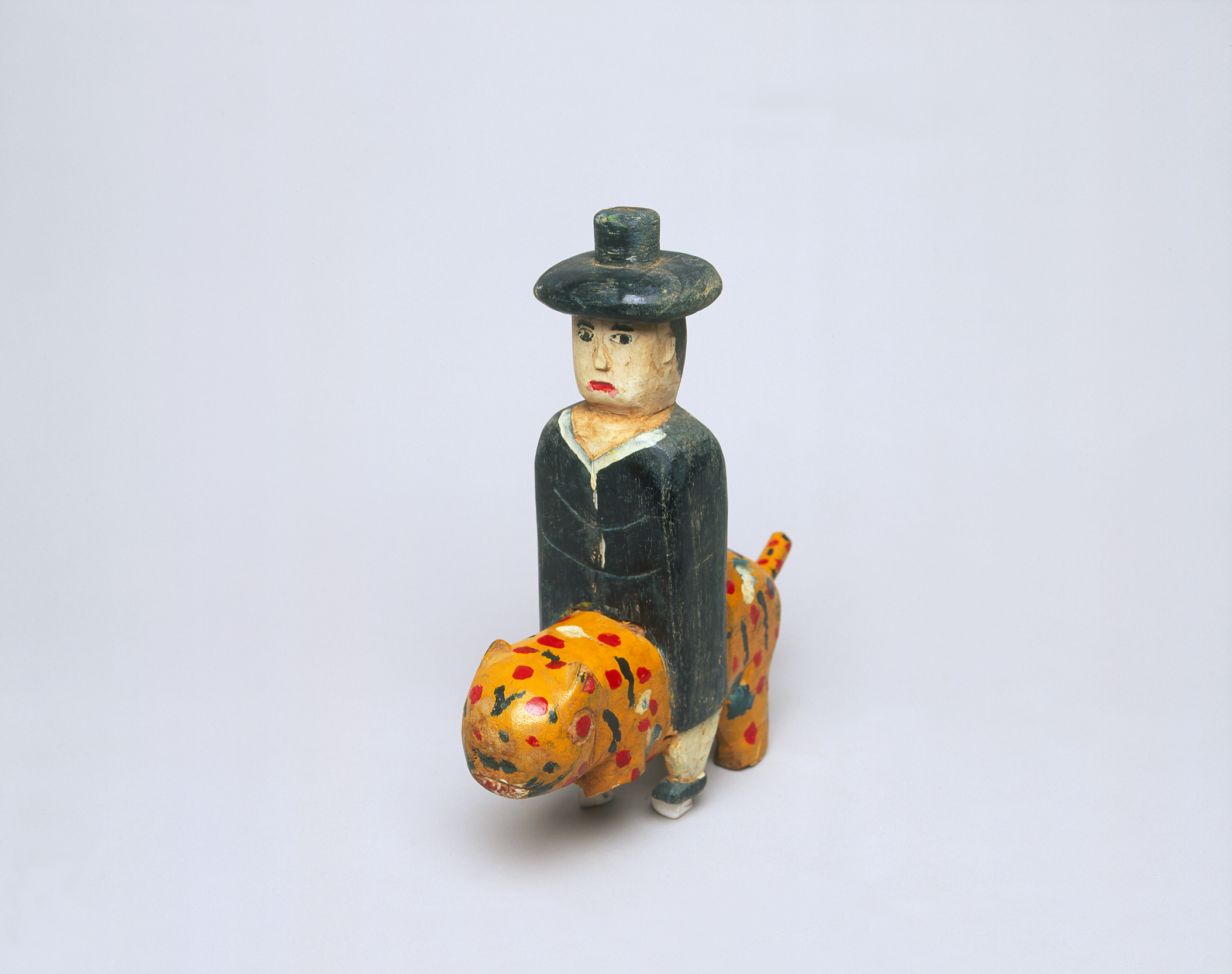
- Figurine of Jeoseung Saja.
- Other names: Jeoseung Chasa
- Hangul: 저승사자
- Abode: Netherworld
- Gender: Male
- Region: Korea
- Ethnic group: Koreans
- Associated deities: Yeomna Daewang

Equivalents
- Hindu: Yamaduta
- Chinese: Yin Cha
- Japanese: Shinigami

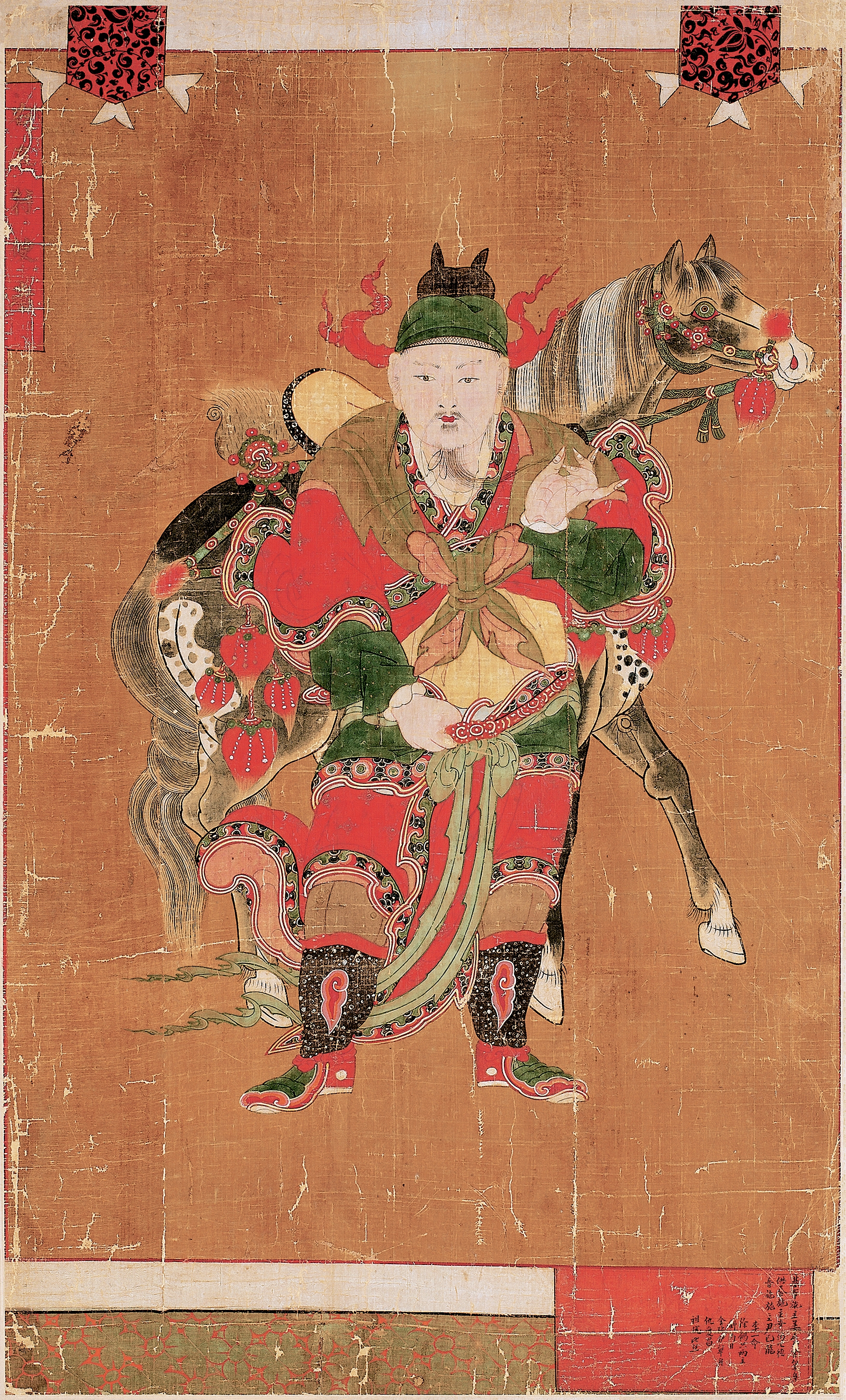
Korean Buddhist depiction of a Jeoseung Saja.

In Korean mythology, Jeoseung Saja (Korean: 저승사자; lit. 'Netherworld Emissary') or Jeoseung Chasa (Korean: 저승차사) are psychopomps who guide the souls of the dead to the afterlife. Like Yeomna Daewang (Korean: 염라대왕; Hanja: 閻羅大王), Jeoseung Sajas are both Buddhist divinities, who were adopted by Korean Shamanism and eventually became associated with Korean beliefs not found in Buddhism.

Jeoseung Sajas are depicted as a stern and ruthless bureaucrat in Yeomna Daewang's service. A psychopomp, he escorts all—good or evil—from the land of the living to the netherworld when the time comes. One of the representative names of Jeoseung Saja is Gangnim Doryeong, who guides the soul to the entrance of the underworld. According to legend, he always carries Jeokpaeji (적패지; 赤牌旨), the list with the names of the dead written on a red cloth. When he calls the name of Jeokpaeji three times, the soul leaves the body and follows him inevitably.

In Korean shamanism tradition, Jeoseung Sajas are typically depicted as soldiers, but in the KBS drama “Hometown of Legends" (Korean: 전설의 고향), they appeared as eerie figures wearing black durumagi, a gat, and sporting pale makeup; this image has since become the first thing that comes to mind when people think of Jeoseung Saja today.

== Name ==
The name Jeoseung Saja (저승사자) can be translated as 'Netherworld Emissary.' Jeoseung (저승) means 'netherworld' or 'underworld', Saja (사자; 使者) means 'emissary' or 'messenger.'

In Korea, the term Jeoseung Saja is sometimes used as a general term for psychopomps.

== See also ==
- Life replacement narratives
- Chasa bon-puri
- Myth of General Sinui
- Yamaduta
- Saja Boys
- Shinigami
- Yin Cha

== Sources ==
- Jeong Jae-min (1996). 延命說話의 변이양식과 운명인식 [Variations of Life-Prolonging Tales and the Perception of Fate]. Gubi Munhak Yeon'gu (in Korean) (3). The Society of Korean Oral Literature: 349–378. ISSN 1229-019X.
- Song Mi Kyoung (2011). 사령형(使令型) 인물의 형상화 양상 및 전형성 [Aspects of Characterization and Typicality of the "Messenger" Archetype]. Gubi Munhak Yeon'gu (in Korean) (32). The Society of Korean Oral Literature: 308–350. ISSN 1229-019X.
