= Myth of General Sinui =

Korean myth about General Sineui

The Myth of General Sineui is a Korean oral myth about General Sineui, who attempted to cheat death. Unlike other myths such as the Samani Bonpuli (in which the protagonist cheated death for forty thousand years), in this myth, the protagonist fails to revive.

== Plot ==
The mountain of Geumo, located today in Chilgok County, was the home to the Pyeongsan Sin clan. Mount Geumo was an auspicious mountain, and Sineui was born under its power.

Sineui grew into a fine boy, then a great general. Above all, Sineui wanted to cheat death.

One day, a Jeoseung Saja came to Sineui's house. Jeoseung Saja were death gods, who reaped the souls of the dead and brought them to the Underworld. The Jeoseung Saja attempted to enter Sineui's house, but he could not cross the orange trees that surrounded the house. Sineui himself had planted them, knowing that oranges warded off evil. But after four days, he found a peach tree, a plant of evil. He crossed the walls using the peach tree.

When the Jeoseung Saja met Sineui, he found that he had pierced a silver pin on his head. Silver also warded off evil gods. However, the Jeoseung Saja hid under the floors of the house. When Sineui went to wash his face, the Jeoseung Saja sprang up and reaped him by hitting him with an iron hammer. His will was not to bury him for a week.

Sineui escaped the Underworld, defeating the Gaekgwi (Gaekgwi are ghosts that roam between the Underworld and the mortal world), and returned to his family. However, his family had buried him under the earth. Because his body was underground, he suffocated quickly and died again.

== Collection ==
This myth was originally retold in Chilgok County. The University of Andong recorded the myth, and wrote it down in the Journal of Historical Sites of Mt. Geumo in 1994.

== Moral ==
This myth gives the moral that destiny (such as death) is created by the gods, and that it is foolish to fight against destiny.
