= Jinjia Yinsuo =

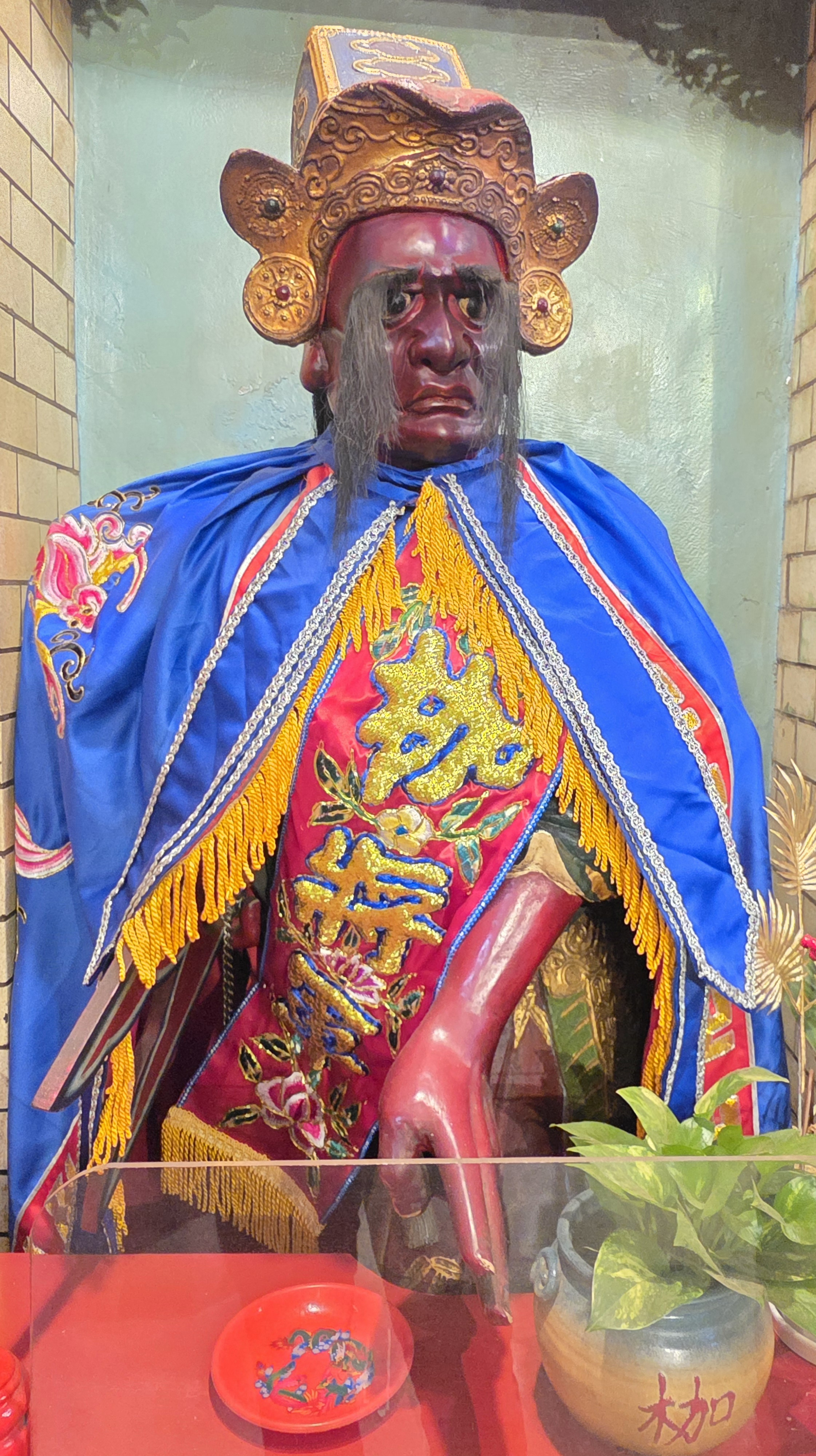
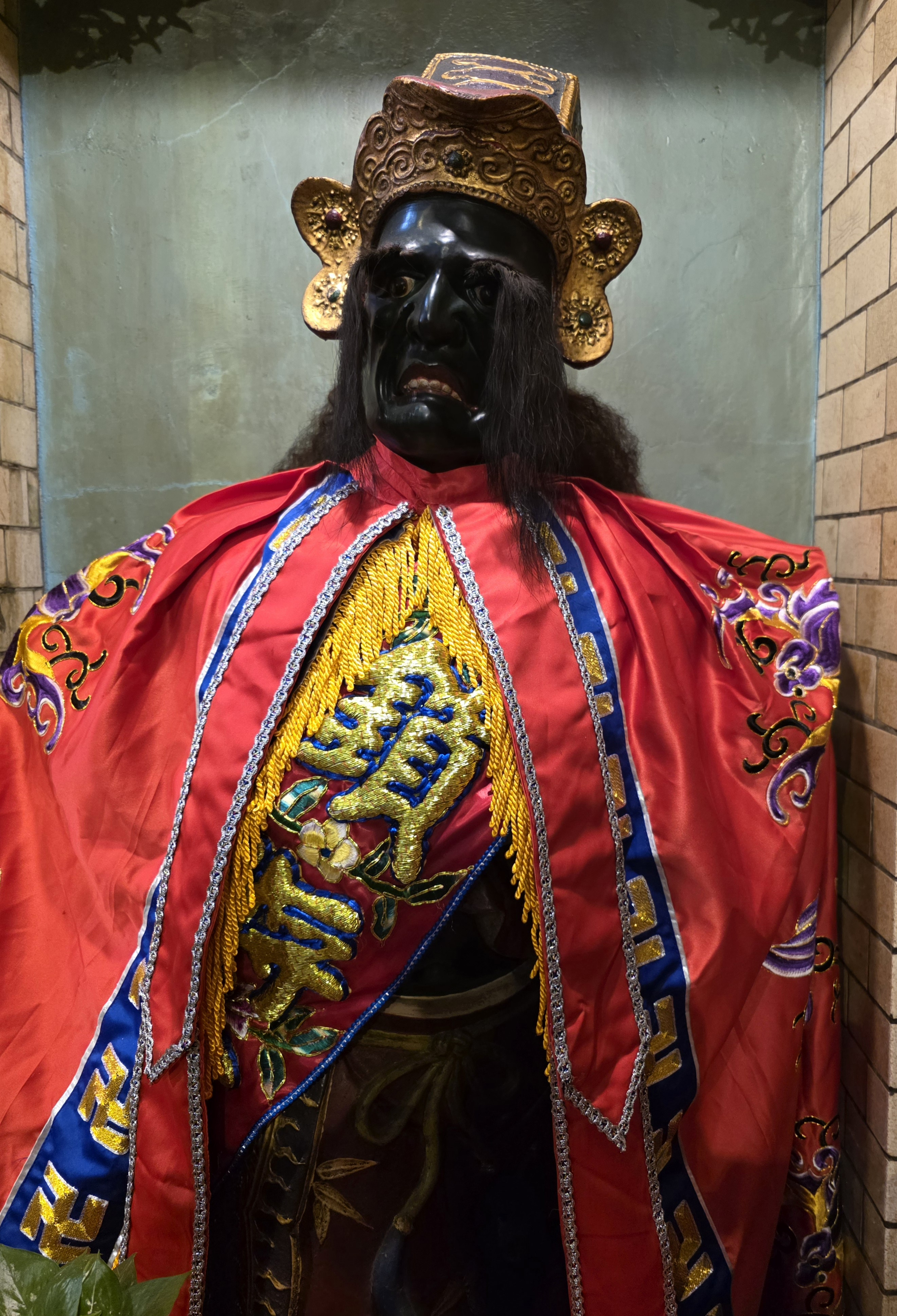
Left (Statue of the Golden Chain General). Right (Statue of the Silver Lock General).

Jinjia Yinsuo (金枷银锁, lit. the Golden Shackle and Silver Chain), also known as the Shackle and Chain Generals (枷锁将军, Jiasuo Jiangjun), are deities of the underworld Diyu, tasked with escorting souls to the afterlife. They are distinguished by their red and green faces. In some traditions, they are also known as two of Chenghuang's six trusted generals, alongside Heibai Wuchang and Niutou Mamian. They are typically subordinate to Yanluo Wang, Dongyue Dadi, and City God. The Golden Chain General is revered as Master of Chains, while the Silver Lock General is known as Master of Shackles. These two generals are responsible for escorting souls to the Bridge of Hesitation (Naihe Bridge), where they must present the Book of Life and Death.
