= Ajamila =

Figure in the Hindu text Bhagavata Purana

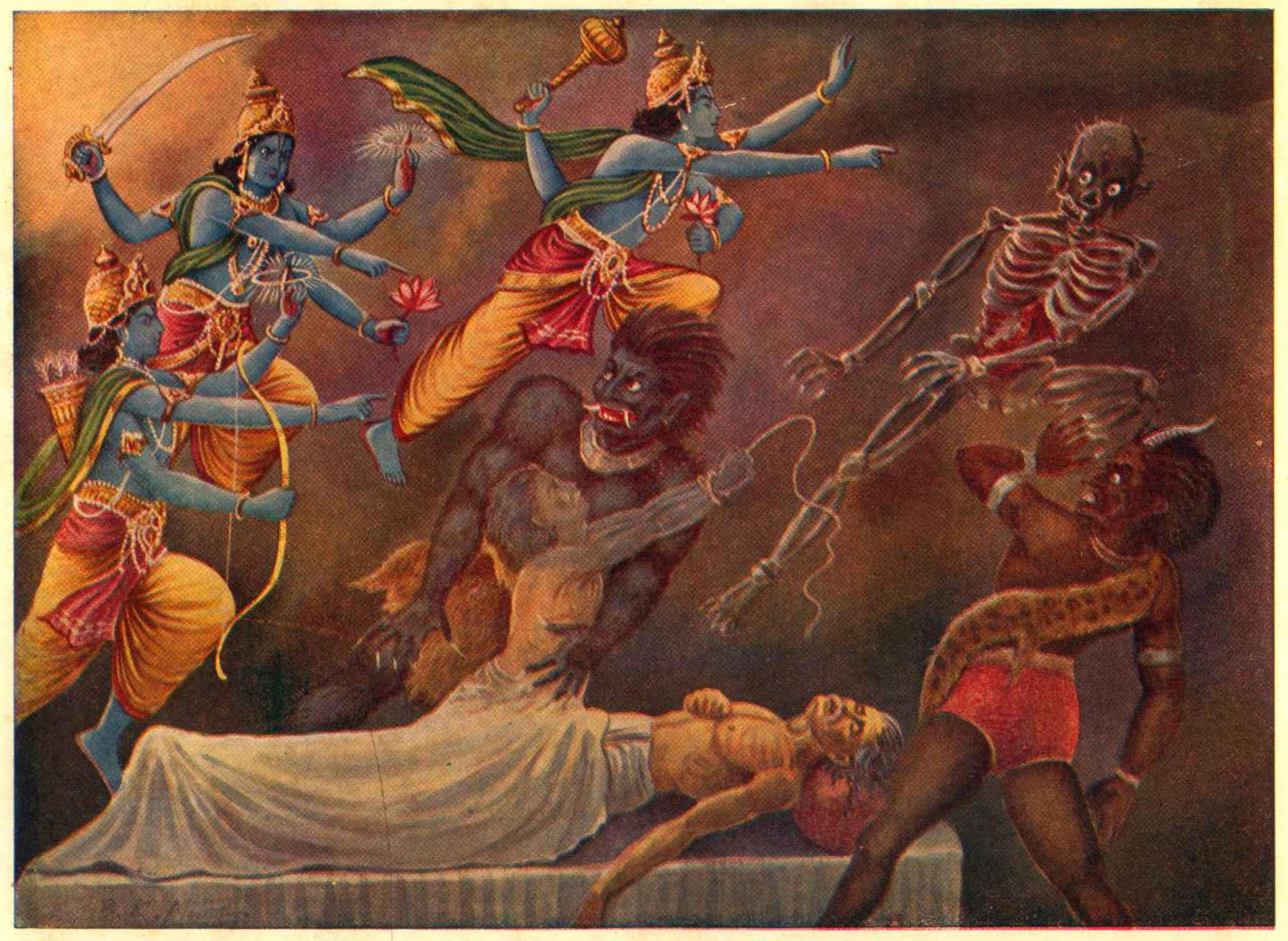
Vishnudutas (left) rescue Ajamila's soul from Yamadutas.

Ajamila (Sanskrit: अजामिल, IAST: Ajāmila) is a Brahmin whose story is told in canto 6 of the Bhagavata Purana. In Hinduism, the story of Ajamila is used to illustrate that by uttering God's divine name, there is hope for even the sinful to be redeemed from their propensity to commit sins.

== Legend ==
=== Early life and downfall ===
In the city of Kanyākubja (modern-day Kannauj), there lived a Brahmin called Ajamila. Originally Ajamila was gentle, truthful, learned and dedicated to serving his elders, guests, and teachers. One day, this reticent and humble Brahmin, who was obedient to his father, went to the forest to collect fruits, flowers, sticks for sacrificial fire, and kusha grass. On his way back, he chanced upon a passionate harlot, intoxicated on maireya liquor, who was singing with her sari knot untied. Despite his efforts to control himself using the instructions of sacred texts, his mind became agitated and he was unable to resist his temptation to claim her for himself. Infatuated, he set aside his own wife and married this woman. He also neglected the Vedic way of life that a Brahmin was expected to adhere to. He resorted to a life of crime for supporting his family and her children from other men, holding captives for ransom, gambling, committing frauds, and thefts.

=== Deathbed and the arrival of Yamadutas ===
He had ten children by this woman, the youngest of whom he was most fond of and had named Narayana (a theonym). After a period of eighty-eight years, while feeding his child and oblivious to his approaching end, on his deathbed, he saw the Yamadutas, three extremely terrible male figures with wry faces, twisted snouts, erect hair, and holding nooses in their hands, who had come to take his soul. Greatly frightened, he called out in a loud labored voice to his son, Narayana.

=== The dialogue between the Vishnudutas and Yamadutas ===
Hearing the name of their lord invoked, the four-armed, golden-clad the Vishnudutas, the servants of Vishnu, appeared and forcefully rescued him from the clutches of hell as the Yamadutas dragged his soul. The Vishnudutas and the Yamadutas engaged in a dialogue regarding the nature of righteousness and punishment, and brought the Brahmin before Yama for arbitration. The Yamadutas argued that dharma consists of Vedic injunctions, that entities like the sun and wind witness human actions (karma), and that Ajamila had spent decades committing sins that were unatoned and that demanded punishment under the laws of karma.

The Vishnudutas countered that the Yamadutas were giving punishment unlawfully to a sinless person. They warned that authorities that allow injustice set a bad standard for common people to follow. They asserted that chanting the four syllables "Na-ra-ya-na" at death serves as the best atonement for any sinner. This is because the sound attracts the mind of Vishnu and burns sins like fire kindling wood and functions like medicine even when taken by someone ignorant. They emphasized that uttering "Hari" even in the middle of crises like falling, tripping, or getting burned frees a person from suffering in hell.

=== Deliverance and redemption ===
The Vishnudutas explained that the Shastras state that the mere utterance or the recitation of the name of Vishnu, even if taken to denote another person, or in a friendly joke, or as an insertion during the recitation of a song, or even as an apparent insult, completely annihilates all the sins of the one who utters it. Following this exchange, the Vishnudutas freed Ajamila from Yama's bonds. This caused the Yamadutas to return to King Yama, while the Vishnudutas suddenly vanished as Ajamila suddenly started to speak.

Ajamila, who witnessed the exchange between the beings, fell into remorse, announcing that he had indeed led a vile life and unworthy of his Brahminhood, and would henceforth lose his sense of self in his service to Vishnu. He repented for abandoning his wife, his son, and his elderly parents, lamenting that his actions had condemned him to hell. He reflected that his soul was controlled by maya and vowed to give up the false identification he felt with his body.

By this manner, Ajamila, who had neglected his duties and led a sinful life, was able to achieve moksha, and attain Vaikuntha.

== Theological teachings and messages ==
=== The power of mantra ===
The story of Ajamila is seen as a theological argument for the power of chanting the name of God, or mantra. The chanting of a mantra is seen in bhakti but also in meditation yoga(Patanjali) as the primary and most immediate form of directly contacting God.

The story of Ajamila shows that even when the repetition of the name of God is not done with the intention of contacting the divine, it is still effective in liberating a sinner like Ajamila. Ajamila's liberation after an inadvertent utterance of the name of Narayana shows that there is "superexcellency" to the recitation of such divine names. Within yoga and bhakti there aren't any other methods that can purify the mind like this. Iśvara in the form of sound can engage the mind and remove all desires while other practices of atonement may only cancel the effects of karma produced by acts of adharma.

In the narrative, the power of uttering God's name is likened to the fire that burns dry grass, or to a medicine that works even when taken by someone who doesn't understand how it works. Uttering the divine name Narayan, which is another name for Vishnu, even when calling out for his child, is shown to rescue Ajamila from the Yamdutas and illustrate the power and glory of Vishnu. In Bhagavata theology it is understood that through the utterance of Vishnu's name, Ajamila, as an associate of Bhagwan, attains a Brahman form by which his relationship with Vishnu can continue in Vaikuntha forever.

From the perspective of narrative therapy, the story of Ajamila shows the "therapeutic power of symbolic language and remembrance." The sacred narrative addresses deep-seated themes of guilt and illustrates how a person's life can be "rewritten at the moment of crisis." Here, in the story of Ajamila, a story failure is rewritten as one of redemption.

=== Death and dying in Hinduism ===
In the Hindu tradition, the moment of death is a critical spiritual junction. The narratives of the Bhagvata Purana show a grasp over the multiple "psychological dimensions of human life." The stories of the Purana explore themes of fear, guilt, and resilience that offer effective approaches to healing and help individuals reframe experiences.

== See also ==
- Markandeya
- Gajendra
- Prahlada
