= Life replacement narratives =

Korean shamanic narratives chants

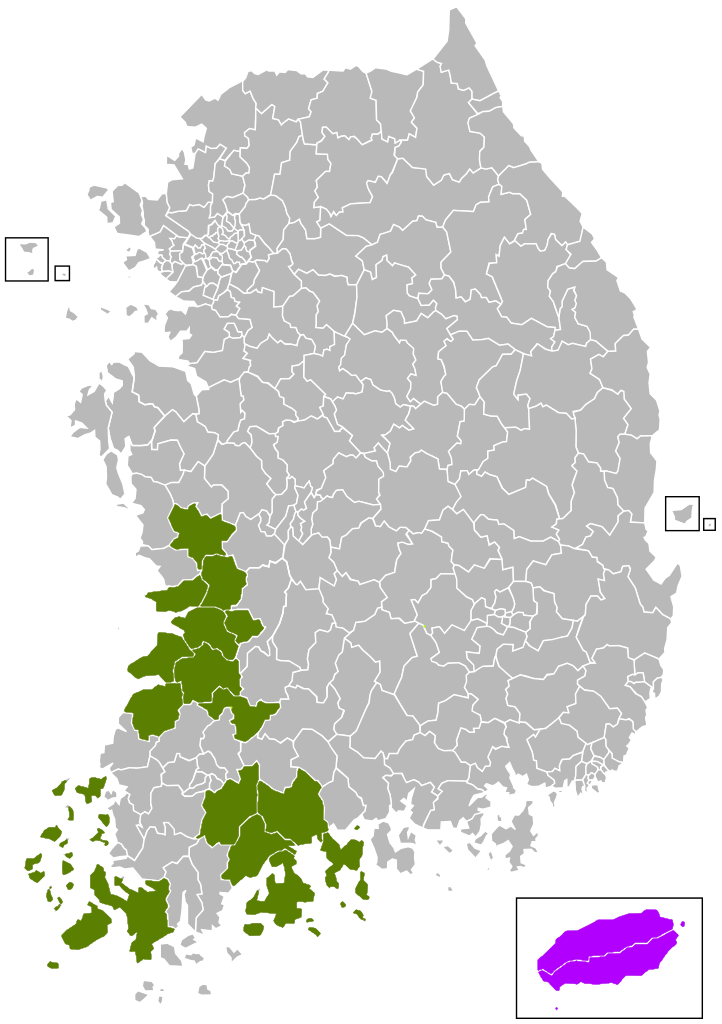
Distribution of versions of life replacement narratives so far transcribed by researchers across second-level administrative divisions of South Korea. Purple is the Menggam bon-puri, and green is the Jangja-puri. Both versions of the Honswi-gut narrative were recited by shamans from Hamhung, now North Korea.

Life replacement narratives or life extension narratives refer to three Korean shamanic narratives chanted during religious rituals, all from different regional traditions of mythology but with a similar core story: the Menggam bon-puri of the Jeju tradition, the Jangja-puri of the Jeolla tradition, and the Honswi-gut narrative of the South Hamgyong tradition. As oral literature, all three narratives exist in multiple versions.

In all three narratives, a man (or men) is forewarned of his impending death and makes offerings to the chasa, (Note: Also called saja, also meaning "messengers") the gods of death who kill those whose time is due and take away their souls to the afterlife. The chasa unwittingly accept the offerings before realizing that they have accepted gifts from the man that they were supposed to kill. As they cannot ignore his gifts, they decide to spare his life and take the soul of another human or animal in his place. Other parts of the story differ significantly between the three narratives. In the Menggam bon-puri, the man is a hunter who is warned by a benevolent skull, which also makes him rich. In the Jangja-puri, the man is an unpleasant miser whose warning comes in the form of a dream interpreted by his daughter-in-law. In the Honswi-gut, which is the least studied, the human figures are three brothers who are also warned by a skull.

The myths are important in their religious context because they demonstrate the susceptibility of the gods to both gifts and human empathy, and therefore establish the principles and efficacy of shamanic ritual. The importance of the skull in two of the three narratives may reflect an ancient practice of skull worship. The narratives' relationships to folktales, to other shamanic myths, and to a medieval Buddhist tale with a similar story have also been examined.

== Nomenclature ==
- Life replacement narratives
- Hangul: 대명형(연명형) 서사무가
- Hanja: 代命型(延命型)徐事巫歌
- Revised Romanization: Daemyeong-hyeong (yeonmyeong-hyeong) seosa muga
- McCune–Reischauer: Taemyŏng-hyŏng (yŏnmyŏng-hyŏng) sŏsa muga

There is no agreement on what term to use to refer to the three narratives as a category. In all three, the central human figure avoids his imminent death by making offerings to the chasa, the gods of death, who spare him and—in most versions—take another soul in his place. Some scholars emphasize the prolongation of life and refer to "life extension" (yeonmyeong-hyeong) myths or narratives, while others stress the fact that a life is taken in place of another and speak of "life replacement" (daemyeong-hyeong) narratives.

Choi Won-oh uses the term "chasa veneration" (치성차사형/致誠差使型, chiseong chasa-hyeong) narratives. This category includes not only the three life replacement narratives but also the Jimgaje-gut narrative of South Hamgyong Province, a myth in which the chasa only serve to explain the circumstances of three mysterious deaths without extending anyone's life.

== Narratives ==
Korean shamanic narratives are mythological stories chanted by shamans as part of rituals called gut, in which various deities are invoked. They constitute the mythology of the religion of Korean shamanism. In Jeju Island, works of the genre are called bon-puri, literally "origin recitation." In mainland Korea, the term puri "recitation" is common but not universal; they may also simply be named after the gut ritual in which they are performed.

In all three life replacement narratives of Korea, the main figure cheats death by sacrificing to the chasa (Note: Also called saja, also meaning "messengers") (lit. 'Messengers'): a group of gods who are commissioned by the god Yama, king of death, to kill those who are due to die and take their souls to the afterlife. Yama and his messengers are both Buddhist divinities, who were adopted by Korean shamanism and eventually became associated with Korean beliefs not found in Buddhism.

=== Menggam bon-puri ===
Traditional hunters on Jeju Island, early twentieth century

The Jeju Island narrative is titled Menggam bon-puri after Menggam, a deity invoked in one of the rituals in which the narrative is recited. (Note: Menggam is also given as an epithet to a variety of other deities, including the chasa themselves. Some scholars believe that the "Menggam" of the title refers to the chasa and not the separate god. "Menggam" is sometimes written "Maenggam". As discussed in Jeju language#Vowels, /æ/ ae and /e/e are not distinguished by younger Jeju speakers.) It is one of twelve "general bon-puri", which are narratives featuring deities worshipped throughout Jeju Island, and which are recited by all Jeju shamans. Some shamans also title it the Samani bon-puri, after the primary human figure of the myth. As of 2010, at least (Note: Kim Hyung-kun's list does not include the 2002 ritual mentioned in Yun 2019.) ten different versions of the Menggam bon-puri were known to researchers, transcribed between 1962 and 2008.

In most versions, a man named Saman loses his parents at an early age and is reduced to beggary. He marries a fellow beggar. One day, his wife cuts off her hair and tells Saman to go sell it to buy food, but he purchases a gun instead to make a living as a hunter. Unfortunately, he is inexperienced at hunting and struggles.

While in the mountains, Saman encounters an ancient skull. In most versions, this is the skull of the gun's original owner, who was the son of a state councilor. How the owner died varies depending on the version. According to one shaman, he shot himself accidentally with the gun; in other versions, he died of a gust or of cold and hunger, or was killed by a robber who stole the gun. How Saman encounters the skull also varies. In some versions, the skull reveals his identity in a dream while Saman is sleeping in the mountains, then comes rolling to him the next day. Another version states that the skull speaks to Saman during the night and tells him to dig him out of the earth. In all versions, Saman takes the skull with him. He first keeps it outside the house, worrying about what his wife would think, but ultimately brings it home. Saman makes offerings to the skull every festival day, and soon, he has great success in hunting and becomes rich.

One day, the chasa descend to kill Saman and bring his soul to the afterlife, either because his ancestors were angry at Saman worshipping the skull instead, or because Saman was always fated to die at the age of thirty or thirty-three. Forewarning the man of his impending death, the skull tells him to hold a gut ritual and to set out offerings for the chasa. The chasa unwittingly partake of the offerings and decide to spare him, taking the soul of other people or creatures instead: sometimes three horses, sometimes another person who shares the name "Saman", and sometimes another person with the similar name "Oman". Ultimately, the chasa forge Saman's allotted lifespan given in the records of the afterlife, often by adding a line to the number "thirty" (三十) to make it "three thousand" (三千) so that he lives for three thousand years. In some versions, either the chasa's replacement of Saman's soul with another or their extension of Saman's lifespan is omitted.

In several versions, the chasa (either the chasa who spared him or Gangnim, a different chasa) eventually capture Saman by washing soot in a river. When Saman asks them what they are doing, they respond that they are cleaning the soot to make it white. When Saman says that he has not heard anything as ridiculous in his three thousand years of life, the chasa apprehend him and take him to the afterlife.

The Menggam bon-puri is recited during two rituals for different gods: the aek-magi rite, which is dedicated to the chasa and is a component of various larger ceremonies, and the menggam-je ritual, dedicated specifically to the god Menggam and to the agricultural goddess Segyeong. The purpose of the aek-magi (from Korean aek "misfortune" and magi "preventing") is to ask the chasa to forestall misfortune, including the death they bring. Over the course of the ritual, the shaman specifies the household that is to be saved from misfortune through this particular aek-magi, invites the gods to partake in the sacrifice, and finally delivers the message of the chasa to the worshippers. The menggam-je is a small-scale ritual traditionally held on the first month of the year to ensure success in agriculture, husbandry, and hunting. The deity Menggam appears to have been a hunting god of the mountains, whose divine functions expanded to animal husbandry and other livelihoods as hunting declined in Jeju Island. In the narrative, Menggam—the god who brings success to hunters—is represented by the skull.

=== Jangja-puri ===
The Jangja-puri is the life replacement narrative of the Jeolla shamanic tradition. As of 2017, thirty-eight versions were known, transcribed between 1966 and 2006.

The early parts of the myth are the same in most versions. Sama-jangja, the namesake of the narrative, is an unpleasant and miserly rich man (Korean jangja "very rich person"). One version describes his behavior in the following terms:

When loaning grain to others, he loaned with a small measure and received with a large measure;

He would loan money in the morning and demand repayment in the evening;

He sold rice mixed with sand, and water in place of soy sauce;

He gave only the outer leaves of kimchi to others;

He kicked pregnant dogs in their sides and threw the dredges of sesame seeds in drainage ditches;

He put gourds on the kitchen table and sharpened knives on the kitchen hearth;

He gave false information, causing local officials to chase after empty errands;

He would have a large ox brought to his field and then drive it off like a dog without even using it;

He had so many sins that one cannot speak of them all.

Because of his sins—either a failure to worship his ancestors, his abuse of fellow humans, or both—Sama-jangja is doomed to die. One night, he has a dream foreshadowing his impending death, but only his daughter-in-law correctly predicts its meaning. Eventually, Sama-jangja understands that he is about to die. He begins to do charity and prepares a large gut ritual for the chasa. As in the other narratives, the chasa unwittingly accept the sacrifice. But the ending differs greatly. In some versions, the chasa simply decide not to take anybody, and Sama-jangja lives a long life. In most others, the chasa spare Sama-jangja and take either his neighbor Uma-jangja or a horse instead. In many versions, the chasa take the horse after their deceit involving Uma-jangja is discovered (or vice versa). In one account, they resort to the horse after being defeated by the household gods of Uma-jangja. Finally, some versions have Sama-jangja dying and being punished after all, either because the gods discover the chasa's schemes or because the horse in the afterlife eventually turns into Sama-jangja and the living Sama-jangja turns into the horse.

The Jangja-puri is sung during the ssitgim-gut, the funeral ritual of Jeolla shamanism in which the soul of the deceased is purified and dispatched to the afterlife.

=== Honswi-gut ===
The Honswi-gut narrative was chanted by shamans of South Hamgyong Province (now in North Korea) in the Honswi-gut, a ritual intended to cure severe illnesses. Whether the ritual was believed to cure the illnesses of adults or of children is unclear. Two versions are known: one transcribed in 1926 and titled Hwangcheon-honsi, and the other transcribed in 1965 from shamans who had fled to South Korea and titled Honswi-gut. The 1926 version is summarized below.

Three impoverished brothers—Songnim-dong, I-dong, and Sama-dong—start farming. One day, they discover an abandoned skull. They bring it home and make offerings to it three times a day, and they soon become rich. After five or six years, the skull begins to shed tears. When the brothers ask why, the skull reveals that the chasa are coming within three days and tells them to prepare a great feast with the fortune that they have been given. They do so, and the chasa arrive and eat the food. The brothers then reveal themselves, and the chasa spare them. Songnim-dong's soul is replaced by a yellow cow; I-dong's, by a raincoat; Sama-dong's, by a bronze bowl. The brothers live long lives and die at the age of eighty-one. After their death, they become gods who are prayed to in the Honswi-gut.

The 1965 version is largely similar, except that the brothers bury the skull instead of worshipping it, that there is no mention of the brothers becoming rich, and that the chasa take the souls of other people who share their names and dates of birth, not cows and objects.

Large-scale shamanic rituals are no longer practiced in North Korea, and the South Hamgyong shamans who fled the division of Korea did not pass down their rituals. The narrative may therefore no longer be in oral transmission. A 2010 listing of academic work on life replacement narratives did not include any study specifically about the Hamgyong narrative.

== Religious significance ==
The life-exchanging myths are important in that they "clearly demonstrate the nature of the deities and the value systems of [Korean] shamanic belief," with even the gods being depicted as being greatly swayed by injeong: a term referring simultaneously to offerings and to the emotion of jeong, or feelings of compassion and empathy, that both gods and humans are thought to share.

Yun Kyoim notes that the Menggam bon-puri establishes principles crucial to Jeju ritual: "the themes of reciprocity... the rules of gift exchange—to give, receive, and return." The reciprocity between the human and divine begins with Saman's encounter with the skull. Once the skull successfully creates a social bond with Saman by discussing how he had once hunted with the very same gun, the human and the deity establish a reciprocal relationship from which both sides prosper. The importance of reciprocity continues in Saman's dealings with the chasa. Once the chasa realize they have unwittingly accepted Saman's sacrifice, they "cannot ignore his plea." The ensuing favor from the chasa is not a quid pro quo, but a gift of divine generosity provoked by the injeong that Saman has for the gods. The narrative thus demonstrates that proper worship of the gods can overcome human destiny.

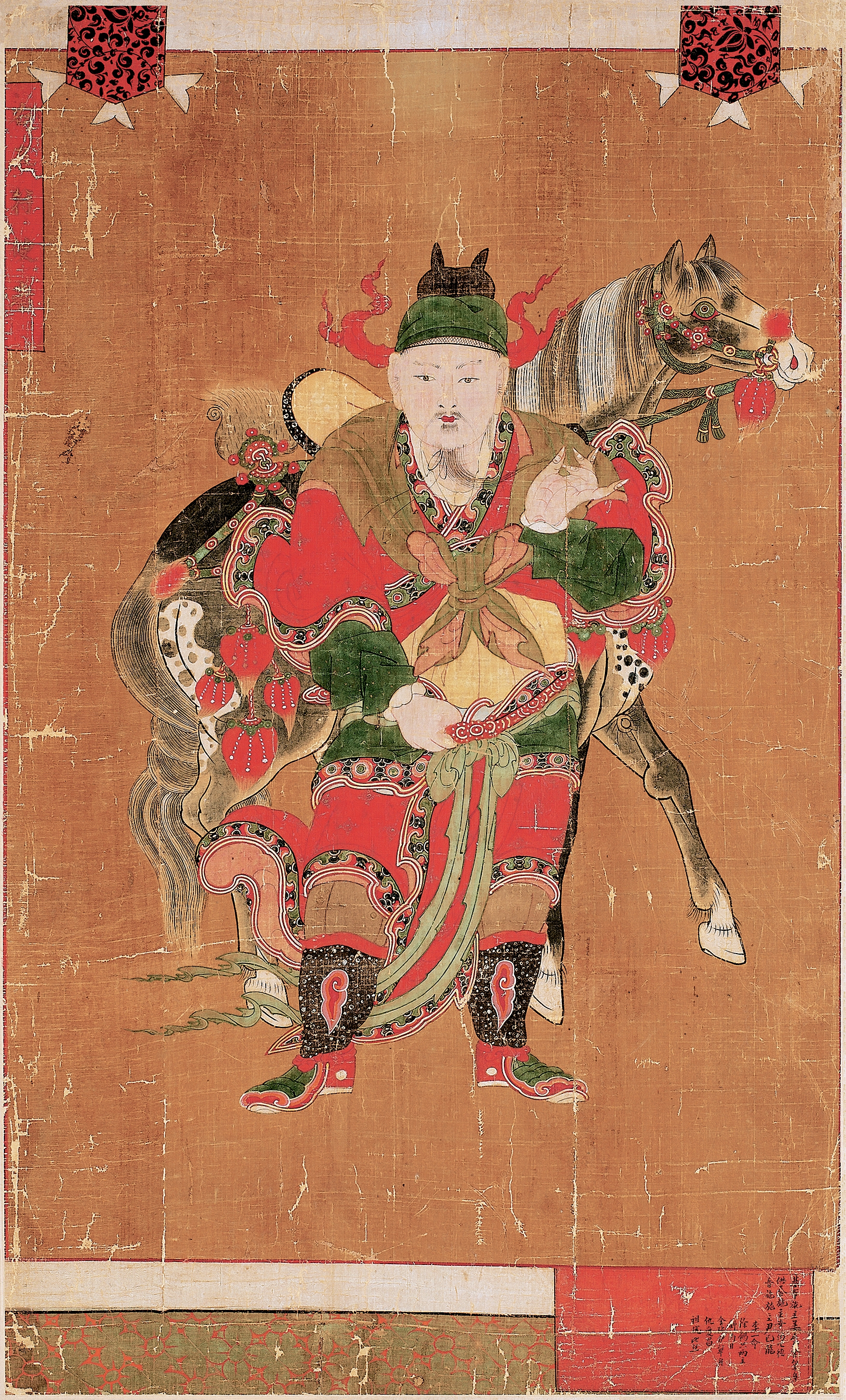
Korean Buddhist depiction of a chasa

Shamans themselves say that the purpose of reciting the narrative during the aek-magi ritual is to remind the chasa of the favor they once showed Saman, and to invite them to show similar generosity to the worshippers involved in the current ritual. Indeed, the shaman strangles a red rooster during the aek-magi. (Note: According to shamans, the original sacrifice was a cow or a horse. Because most people in Jeju Island were too poor to own either animal, it was replaced by a rooster.) In cases of rites held for severe illness, the shaman mounts a straw model of the patient on a horse and chases the animal away; it must not return to the house. The lives of the rooster and the horse are offered to the chasa as replacements for human death, just as Saman's death was replaced by the death of others in the myth.

The narrative is ultimately followed by the shaman's delivery of the chasa's message as divined through the mengdu. In one 2002 aek-magi, the chasa announced that the worshipping family would be exempt from an upcoming visit to the village, and explained why:

We can't ignore

The offered sacrifice.

As your sincerity was utmost,

We accepted the sacrifice.

The myth of Saman thus "flows over into the reality" of the worshippers.

Like its Jeju equivalent, the Jangja-puri demonstrates that the gods of death can be swayed through injeong, even for a man as sinful as Sama-jangja, and therefore affirms the ritual efficacy of the ssitgim-gut funeral. The narrative's detailed portrayal of the afterlife and its gods as fundamentally akin to the world of the living, complete with corrupt officials, may seek to reduce the funeral attendees' fears and anxieties towards death. Hong Tae-han also argues that in the majority of versions where Sama-jangja survives, he serves as a contrast to the person for whom the funeral is being held—who, unlike in the myth, will never cheat death. As the shaman sings the Jangja-puri, the bereaved weep and reach emotional catharsis.

The Jangja-puri has also been described as the origin myth of the ssitgim-gut funeral itself, explaining the purpose of the ritual. In several versions, Sama-jangja holds a funeral for the horse who has taken his place. In one version, the horse appears in Sama-jangja's dreams to speak of its torment; the man then feels terrible pain. A shaman tells him to hold a ssitgim-gut for the horse. The funeral successfully frees the dead horse from its punishment in the afterlife and turns it into a human, relieving the animal of its sorrows and curing Sama-jangja as well.

With the first day's gut, the iron plating falls from the horse's head;

With the second day's ssitgim-gut, the great cangue falls from the neck;

With the third ssitgim-gut, the netting falls from the body;

With the fourth ssitgim-gut, the cuffs break on its hands;

With the fifth ssitgim-gut, the shackles fall from its feet;

The horse leaves, having become a human;

Its archenemy [Sama-jangja] has become its benefactor.

This section of the Jangja-puri thus explains the theology of the ssitgim-gut. Upon death, the grief and resentment (han) of the deceased soul—physically represented in the narrative by the shackles on the dead horse—bring misfortune upon the living. The funeral is necessary to allow the dead soul to be cleansed of its sorrows, and thereby to protect the living from misfortune.

The life replacement narratives also emphasize the practical ethics of Korean shamanism, such as the value of charity. The reason that Sama-jangja and (in many versions) Saman are doomed to die early is because they neglect their ancestors, their neighbors, or both, despite possessing great wealth. As the chasa tell Sama-jangja's family in one version:

"If you would save your father

Do not scorn those who have nothing, and feed the hungry."

Implying a connection between wealth, sinful behavior, and resulting premature death, the narratives urge the rich to fulfill their social responsibilities towards both their ancestors and their neighbors—or indeed, to actively reduce their wealth through ritual or charity—in order to prevent such a death.

== Connections to other narratives ==
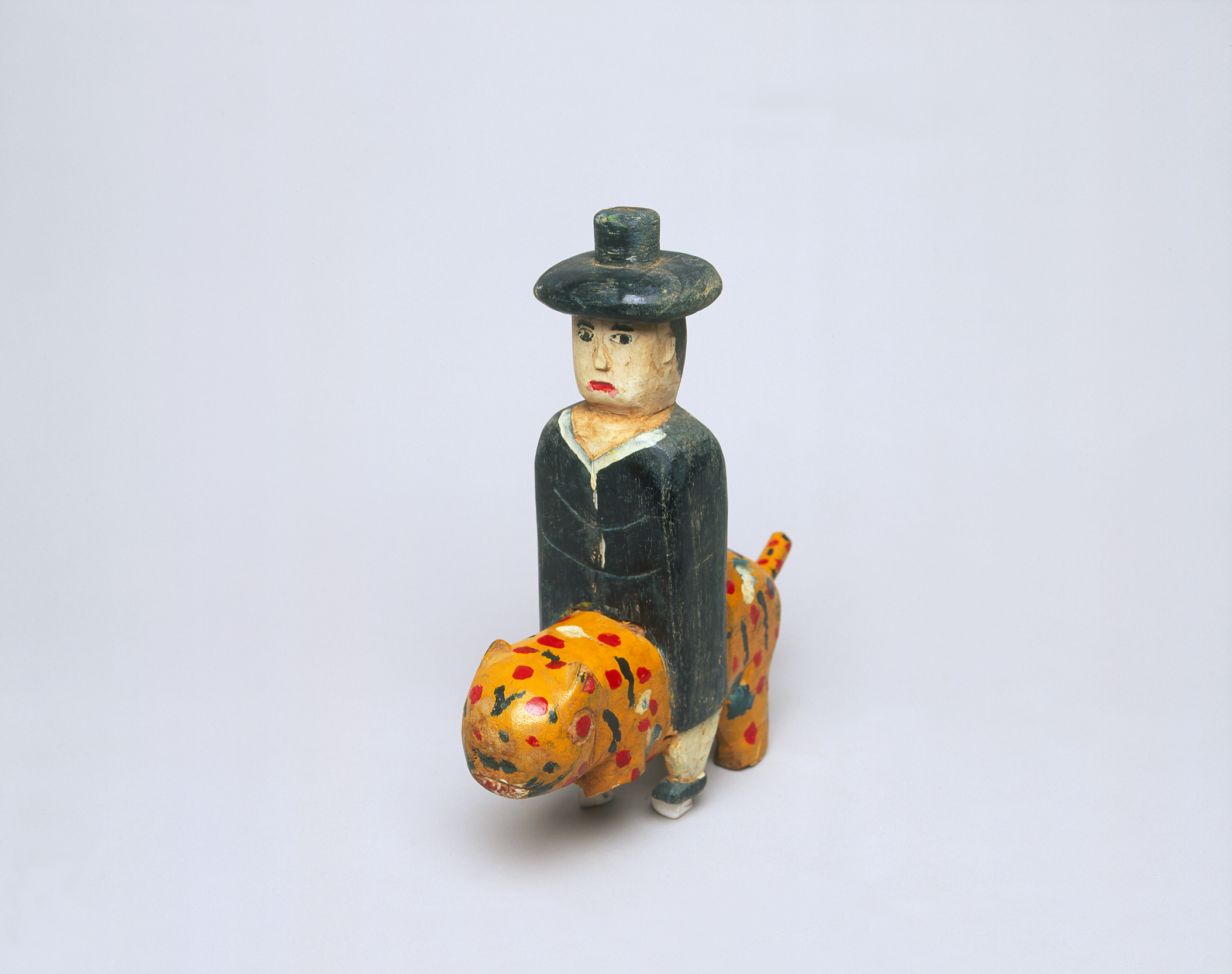
Korean figurine of a chasa wearing a gat. The tiger-like beast that he rides is not associated with the Buddhist chasa.

Scholars have examined both the connections between the three modern life replacement narratives, and their relationship to other stories known in Korea.

The three modern narratives may all descend from a single source. Notably, although Jeju is the southernmost part of Korea and Hamgyong is a far northern periphery, both the Menggam bon-puri and the Honswi-gut feature a benevolent skull. Choi Won-oh argues that this implies that the life replacement narratives stemmed from an ancient culture that practiced skull veneration (which is no longer known in Korea), with the Jangja-puri narrative being an innovation.

The idiosyncrasies of each of the three narratives may be due to influence from other shamanic narratives, or from local folklore. For instance, the initial relationship between Saman and the skull—in which the latter supernaturally reveals himself as a man who died a violent death, then rewards his human devotee by making him a great hunter—is found only in the Menggam bon-puri. This story closely matches the conventions of Jeju village-shrine bon-puri (myths dedicated to patron gods of villages) and ancestral bon-puri (myths dedicated to patron gods of specific families or occupations). Many of the gods invoked in the latter types of myths are also souls of those who met untimely deaths who manifest in a human's dream to express their need to be worshipped, then reward their devotees with prosperity. Sometimes, even specific narrative details are shared; a Menggam bon-puri version describes the skull jumping into the skirt of Saman's wife in terms very similar to one village-shrine bon-puri's description of a snake-god leaping into the skirt of his worshipper's wife. Thus, the Menggam bon-puri myth may originally have been the ancestral bon-puri of hunters, which eventually entered the ritual life of all Jeju Islanders along with the god Menggam himself as hunting declined. It may also be a fusion of two originally independent narratives: an indigenous myth about the skull-god, and a narrative imported from the mainland about Saman escaping the chasa.

Similarly, the Jangja-puri bears a close relationship to the Korean folktale of the Rich Man's Pond (장자못 Jangja-mot). In this story, a miserly rich man (jangja) abuses and chases away a Buddhist monk asking for alms. When his daughter-in-law secretly visits the monk to give him alms, he tells her to flee the house the next day and to not look back. The daughter-in-law flees but does look back, discovers that the rich man's house has become a pond, and turns into stone. The Jangja-puri similarly features the miserly Sama-jangja and his good-hearted daughter-in-law. Some versions even involve a Buddhist monk asking for alms and Sama-jangja abusing him. As in the folktale, the daughter-in-law visits the monk, and he tells her to flee because the house will be turned into a pond. The difference is that the daughter-in-law of the Jangja-puri insists on staying, and that the monk's prophecy never comes to pass. In most versions, she alone accurately interprets Sama-jangja's ensuing dream. She often makes the arrangements for the gut ritual for the chasa, directly saving her father-in-law's life. In many versions, when the chasa's attempt to replace Sama-jangja with Uma-jangja fails, it is the daughter-in-law who tells them to try taking the horse instead. In one version, she officiates the ssitgim-gut ritual for the horse as well. Unlike her equivalent in folklore, who dooms both her family and herself, the daughter-in-law of the myth is the savior of the household. The folktale thus acts as a literary foil highlighting the heroism of the daughter-in-law, who Jeong Je-ho considers a symbol of the shamans officiating the actual ssitgim-gut ritual and reciting the myth.

The Korean Buddhist tale Wangnangbanhon-jeon, written some time before 1304, tells a similar story but with a strong Buddhist slant. One night, a man named Wang Sagwe is visited by the spirit of his dead wife, who explains that she died because her husband had rebuked a man for practicing nianfo, a Buddhist devotional practice, and that he will die for the same reason the next day. To avoid this, he must be practicing nianfo himself when the chasa arrive. The next day, the chasa find Wang deep in nianfo. They reluctantly take him to the court of Yama, but Yama forgives him because he believes that the reason Wang was practicing nianfo was because he had repented. Both Wang and his wife are resurrected and live to the age of 147. The Wangnangbanhon-jeon has no clear source in the Buddhist literary tradition and may be a Buddhist adaptation of the shamanic mythology. On the other hand, the Menggam bon-puri may have been influenced by the Wangnangbanhon-jeon with regards to some details not found in the mainland, such as the extension of Saman's life to unnatural lengths.

Similar stories of extending one's life by making offerings to the chasa appear widely in South Korea (Note: As all relevant folktales were transcribed in or after 1962, after the division of Korea and the Korean War, the distribution of the story in North Korea is unknown.) in the form of folktales or legends without any religious significance. The protagonist of the story is often Dongfang Shuo, an ancient Chinese minister who became a stock character in East Asian legend. In other versions, a grandfather (in one version the sixteenth-century philosopher Yulgok) saves their grandchild's life in this way. While analogous folktales of divinities extending human lifespans are known in China, they are associated with celestial Daoist gods, not with the chasa. The Korean folktales are thus thought to reflect indigenous shamanic beliefs.

== See also ==
- Song of Dorang-seonbi and Cheongjeong-gaksi, a South Hamgyong shamanic narrative sung in funerals
