= Along with the Gods =

2010–2012 South Korean webtoon

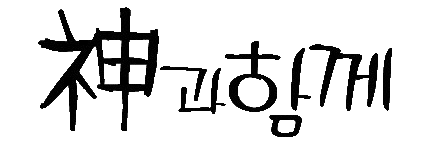

신과함께 RR: Singwa hamkke MR: Sin'gwa hamkke
- Genre: Fantasy, Drama
- Author: Joo Ho-min
- Illustrator: Joo Ho-min
- Publisher: Anibooks
- Webtoon service: Naver Webtoon
- Original run: 2010–2012
- Volumes: 3

Along with the Gods: The Two Worlds

Along with the Gods (Korean: 신과함께; Hanja: 神과함께) is a South Korean manhwa series written and illustrated by Joo Ho-min. The webtoon has been released on the webcomic site Naver Webtoon since 2010, and the first volume in print was published on December 27, 2010. It was inspired by the Korean Joseon dynasty Buddhist paintings and early Buddhist texts of the Ten Kings of Hell.

A stage musical adaptation has been hosted by the Seoul Performing Arts Company since 2015.

A film adaptation, Along with the Gods: The Two Worlds, was released on December 20, 2017, with a sequel, Along with the Gods: The Last 49 Days, released on August 1, 2018. Two additional sequels are in active development as of September 2022, as well as a television series spin-off as of April 2022.

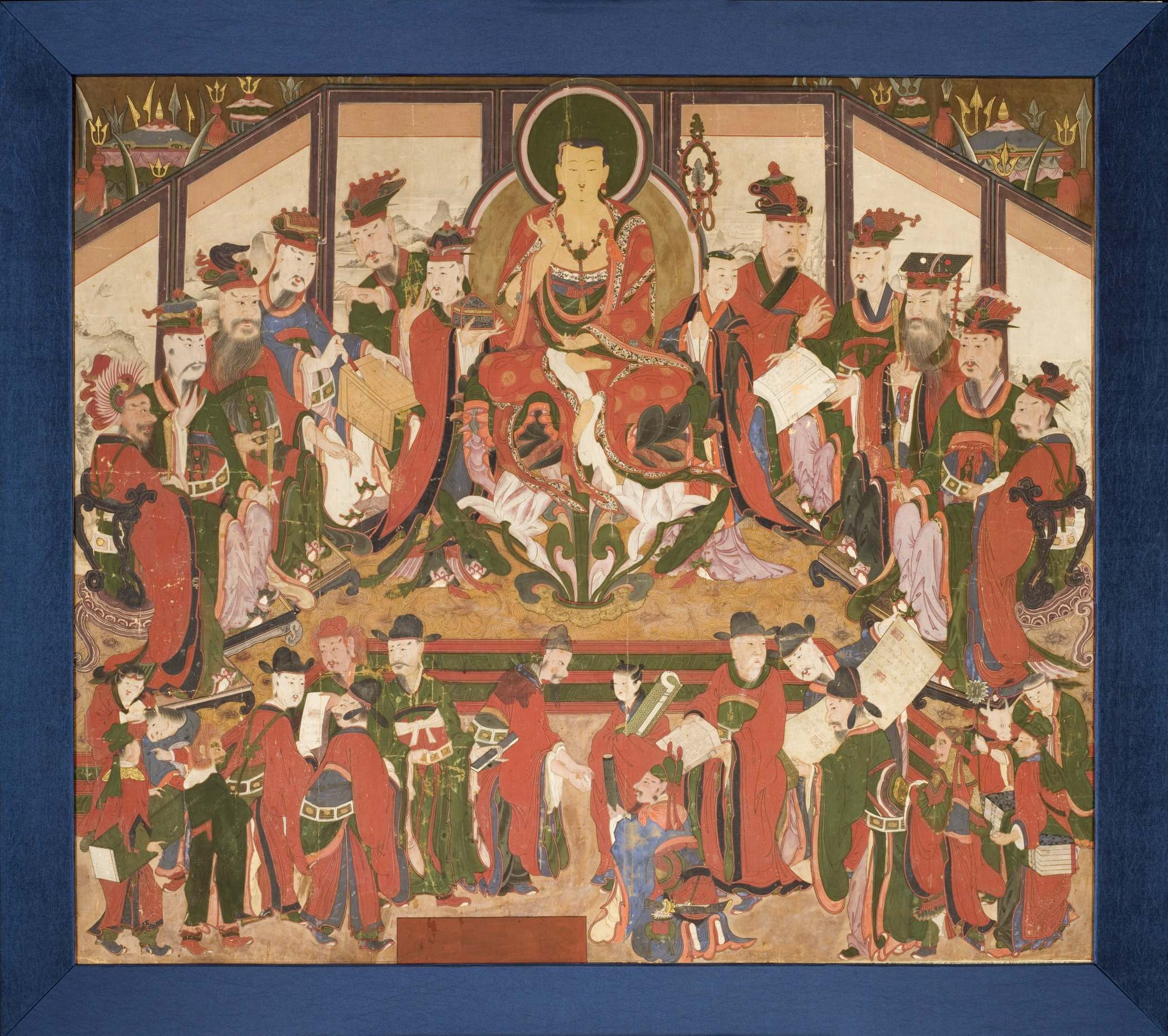
A Korean Joseon dynasty painting of Bodhisattva Jijang and the Ten Kings of Hell

== Published books ==
Japanese remake

No.	Square Enix	
No.	Release date	ISBN
1	July 25, 2012	ISBN 978-4-7575-3678-4
2	January 25, 2013	ISBN 978-4-7575-3867-2
3	August 24, 2013	ISBN 978-4-7575-4051-4
4	July 25, 2014	ISBN 978-4-7575-4366-9

Spanish edition

No.	Planeta Cómic	
No.	Release date	ISBN
1	April 14, 2021	ISBN 978-84-1341-204-7
2	July 7, 2021	ISBN 978-84-13-41683-0
3	October 6, 2021	ISBN 978-84-1341-771-4
4	December 1, 2021	ISBN 978-84-1341-772-1
