= Psychopomp =

Entity believed to escort deceased souls to an afterlife

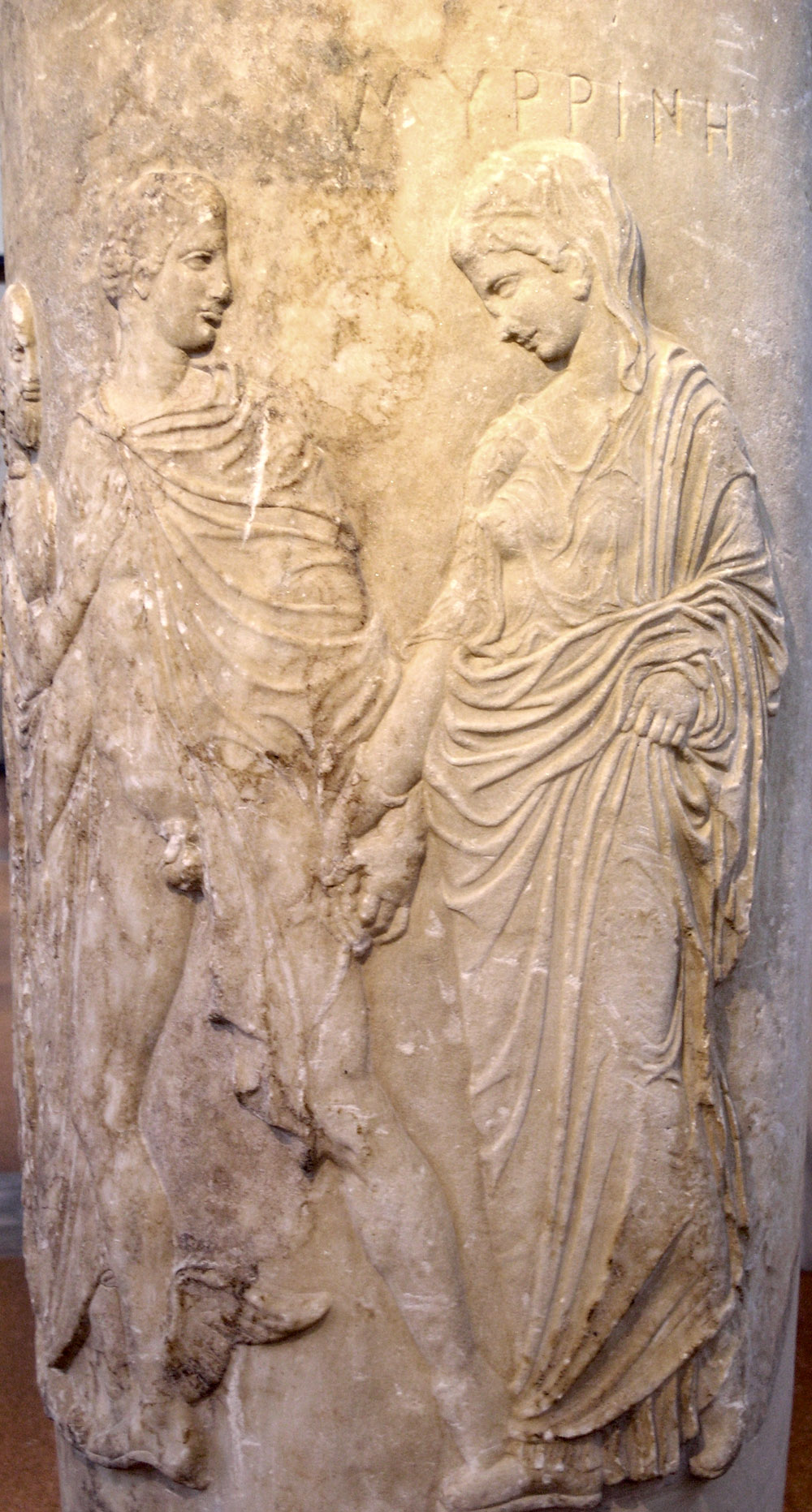
Relief from a carved funerary lekythos at Athens: Hermes as psychopomp conducts the deceased, Myrrine, a priestess of Athena, to Hades, c. 430–420 BC (National Archaeological Museum of Athens)

Psychopomps (from the Greek word ψυχοπομπός, psychopompós, literally meaning the 'guide of souls') are creatures, spirits, angels, demons, or deities in many religions whose responsibility is to escort newly deceased souls from Earth to the afterlife.

Their role is not to judge the deceased, but simply to guide them. Appearing frequently on funerary art, psychopomps have been depicted at different times and in different cultures as anthropomorphic entities, horses, deer, dogs, whip-poor-wills, ravens, crows, vultures, owls, sparrows, and cuckoos. In the case of birds, these are often seen in huge masses, waiting outside the home of the dying.

== Overview ==
=== Ancient religion ===
Classical examples of a psychopomp are the ancient Egyptian god Anubis, the deity Pushan in Hinduism, the Greek ferryman Charon, the goddess Hecate, and god Hermes, the Roman god Mercury, the Norse Valkyries, the Aztec Xolotl, the Slavic goddess Morana, and the Etruscan Vanth.

=== Contemporary religions ===
Heibai Wuchang, literally "Black and White Impermanence", are two deities in Chinese folk religion in charge of escorting the spirits of the dead to the underworld.

The shinigami of Japanese mythology have been described as psychopomps.

The form of Shiva as Tarakeshwara in Hinduism performs a similar role, although leading the soul to moksha rather than to an after-life. Additionally, in the Bhagavata Purana, the Visnudutas and Yamadutas are also messengers for their respective masters, Vishnu and Yama. Their role is illustrated vividly in the story of Ajamila. In many beliefs, a spirit being taken to the underworld is violently ripped from its body.

In the Zoroastrian tradition, Daena, the Zoroastrian self-guide, appears as a beautiful young maiden to those who deserve to cross the Chinvat Bridge, or as a hideous old hag to those who do not.

The polytheistic concept of a specific deity of death is rejected by Abrahamic monotheism, which regards God as the only master of death and life. However, the archangel Samael can be regarded as the Jewish psychopomp, whose role in Talmudic and post-Talmudic theology is as the Angel of death. In Christianity, Saint Peter, Michael the Archangel and Jesus are thought of as psychopomps either as leading the dead to heaven or (as in the case of Peter) allowing them through the gates. In Islam, Azrael plays the role of the angel of death who carries the soul up to the heavens, acting by the permission of God. According to Rudyard Kipling, Azrael "separates the Spirit from the Flesh".

In many cultures, the shaman also fulfils the role of the psychopomp. This may include not only accompanying the soul of the dead, but also at birth helping to introduce the newborn child's soul into the world. This also accounts for the contemporary title of "midwife to the dying" or "End of Life Doula" which is another form of psychopomp work.

In Filipino culture, one of the roles of the goddess Magwayen is being a psychopomp. Ancestral spirits (anito) also function as psychopomps. When the dying call out to specific dead persons (e.g. parents, partners), the spirits of the latter are supposedly visible to the former. The spirits, who traditionally wait at the foot of the death-bed, retrieve (Tagalog: sundô) the soul soon after death and escort it into the after-life.

In Akan religion, Amokye is the woman who fishes souls out of the river and welcomes them to Asamando, the Akan realm of the dead. A deceased person is buried with amoasie (loincloths), jewelry and beads which they then pay to Amokye for admitting them to Asamando.

Many mythologies and superstitions simply have a personification of death as psychopomp. Such personifications frequently present death as a reaper, even ascribing it the title "Grim Reaper".

=== Psychology ===
In Jungian psychology, the psychopomp is a mediator between the unconscious and conscious realms. It is symbolically personified in dreams as a wise man or woman, or sometimes as a helpful beast.

== See also ==
- Life replacement narratives, Korean myths in which psychopomps are persuaded into sparing a person's life.
