= Chasa bon-puri =

Korean shamanic myth of Jeju Island

- Hangul: 차사본풀이
- Hanja: 差使本풀이
- Revised Romanization: Chasa-bonpuri
- McCune–Reischauer: Ch'asa-bonp'uri

The Chasa Bonpuri, known in other versions as the Chesa Bonpuri (1933 version) or the Cheseo Bonpuri (2006 and 2008 versions), is a Korean myth of Jeju Island. It is a myth that tells how Gangnim, the death god, came to be. As one of the best-known myths in the Korean peninsula, the Chasa Bonpuri is a characteristic hero epic.

== Etymology ==
The term Chasa Bonpuri (차사 본풀이) means "Solving the origins of the death god"; modern academic circles synonymize "Bonpuli" with "myth". Chasa is the Standard Korean pronunciation of the Chinese word Chaishi (差使), meaning "messenger". In the Jeju language however, chaishi is pronounced Chesɒ or Cheshi, leading to the different names per each version.

== Collections ==
The Chasa Bonpuli has been directly collected from shamans nine times; below is a chart of these collections.

Title	Shaman	Collector	Book	Date (if available)
Chesa Bonpuli	Park Bongchun	Akiba Dakasi and Akamatsu Jijo	A Study on Korean Shamanism	1930–1933
Chasa Bonpuli	Go Daejung	Jang Jugeun	Korean Folk Stories	August 1968
Siwangmaji Bonpuli	An Sain	Hyeon Yongjun	Encyclopedia of Jeju Shamanism	
Chasa Bonpuli	Yi Yeongju	Jin Seonggi	Encyclopedia of Bonpuli Myths	
Chasa Bonpuli	Kim Haechun	Jin Seonggi	Encyclopedia of Bonpuli Myths	
Chasa Bonpuli	Yi Jeongja	Mun Mubyeong	Jeju Shamanistic Myths	
Chasa Bonpuli	Gang Sunseon	Mun Mubyeong	Jeju Keungut	October 1994
Cheseo Bonpuli	Gang Sunseon	Gang Jeongsik	Siwangmaji Rite in the House of Jeong Byeongchun, in Dongbok	April 2006
Cheseo Bonpuli	Yi Yongok	Heo Namchun	The Bonpulis of the Simbang Yi Yongok	April 2004

== Major plot ==
Like all oral myths, there are multiple versions of the Chasa Bonpuli. The version in the Encyclopedia of Korean Culture, is related here.

King Beomu, who ruled the kingdom of Donggyeong, had seven sons, three of whom would live only fifteen years. The monk of Donggwaneumjeol died, saying to his student; "The lifespans of the three sons of King Beomu are fifteen years. Lengthen their lives by making them monks."

After three years of mourning, the student took the three sons of King Beomu and made them monks. After the princes had been monks for three years, they returned home, but mentor gave the advice to evade the realm of Gwayang, then sent them away with linen and silk.

The princes, however, were famished, and entered the house of Gwayangsaeng, who lived in the realm of Gwayang. The wife of Gwayangsaeng gave them wine, and then killed the princes and took the linen and silk. She sank the bodies in the Jucheon River.

Seven days later, Gwayangsaeng's wife discovered three lotus blossoms floating on the Jucheon River. The wife took the flowers to her home, but the flowers attacked her until she threw them into the fireplace. They became three orbs which she accidentally swallowed. Soon, she grew pregnant, and delivered three triplets.

The triplets were very talented, and when they were fifteen, they were the first, second, and third best in the Gwageo examination. In celebration of their talents, they held a Munjeonje, a ritual to Munsin, the door god, but as they bowed before the door, they all fell dead.

Gwayangsaeng's wife constantly plagued the King of Gwayang, Gimchi Wonnim, to go to the Underworld and bring back Yeomra, the god of the dead, so that she may know the cause of their death. Gimchi Wonnim asked all his ministers to meet him at dawn. However, Gangnim, one of his generals, was drunk from a birthday party for his eighteenth mother-in-law (the mother of his eighteenth concubine), and was late to Gimchi Wonnim's summonings. Using this crime, Gimchi Wonnim sent Gangnim to capture Yeomra.

Gangnim's official wife gave him a siru-tteok after sacrificing two other siru-tteok to Jowangsin, the hearth goddess, and Munsin. His wife also gave him a green robe with a needle pierced on it and red paper with white writing.

On his journey Gangnim encounters gods and spirits who help him find the correct path to the Henggimot Lake and through the lake in to the underworld.

Gangnim encounters Yeomra outside the Yeonchu Gate, slays his thousands of soldiers and servants, and captures Yeomra with a steel chain. Yeomra invites Gangnim to a feast being held by the god Wonbokjangi. Wonbokjangi offers wine to all of the one hundred gods, but not to Gangnim, the hundred-and-first god. The infuriated Gangnim kills Wonbokjangi's wife. When Wonbokjangi offers Gangnim wine as well, Wonbokjangi's wife returns to life.

Yeomra tries to escape, but Gangnim catches him, and Yeomra promises to go to Gwayang. When Gangnim asks for Yeomra to write it down in words, Yeomra tattoos his vow on Gangnim's back, in the script of the Underworld.

Gangnim asked Yeomra the way back to Gwayang. Yeomra tells Gangnim to follow a pure white hound in order to return home. When he arrives his wife is holding a jesa, a mourning ritual, for him. He finds that instead of being gone three days, he had been gone three years. His wife recognizes him by the robe and sewing needle she gave him previously.

The neighbor Kim Seobang, who wanted the hand of Gangnim's wife in marriage, sees Gangnim when looking over the walls. He informs Gimchi Wonnim, the king of Gwayang, that Gangnim was secretly living in his wife's house and the enraged king orders his soldiers to imprison Gangnim.

Yeomra arrives in the land of Gwayang. Yeomra orders Gimchi Wonnim to bring out Gwayangsaeng and his wife, then orders them to dig up the place where they had buried their triplets, but the grave has three empty coffins. When they searched the Jucheon River, the triplets' bones were there. Yeomra restors the three sons of King Beomu to life, and now the Gwayangsaeng couple understand that their triplets were the reincarnated princes that they had murdered eighteen years before. Yeomra turns the Gwayangsaeng couple into mosquitoes, and returns the princes to Donggyeong.

Yeomra asks Gimchi Wonnim to give him Gangnim, but Gimchi Wonnim refuses. Yeomra then offers Gimchi Wonnim a choice between Gangnim's soul and body. Gimchi Wonnim choses the body, and Gangnim's body instantly collapsed. Yeomra makes Gangnim the Jeoseung Chasa, who reaps the souls of the dead.

=== Alternative version ===
The Encyclopedia of Korean Folk Religion's version is this.

King Beomeul of Dongjeong had nine sons. The eldest three and the youngest three died, and only the middle three survived. One day, a passing monk named Muya (who also appears in several other myths) said that the three sons would survive only if they became merchants for six years. The princes headed to the Kingdom of Junyeon. There, they met the wife of Gwayangsaengi, Gwayanggaxi, who gave them poisoned wine. Gwayangsaengi's wife sank the bodies in the Kkachi Well.

The next day, a clump of berries had grown below the Kkachi Well. Gwayanggaxi ate them and grew pregnant. She gave birth to three triplets, who were extremely intelligent; they swept the Gwageo examination. As they knelt to their parents after the Gwageo, they all fell dead.

Gwayanggaxi asked the governing official of her village, which was called Gimchi, to find out the cause of the mysterious deaths. When the official of Gimchi refused, she spread false rumours about the official around the village. The angered official sent his lieutenant, Gangnim, to the Underworld to capture Yeomra and bring him to the mortal world.

When Gangnim's mother heard the news, she gave her son six siru-tteok, advised him to honor all old people he may meet on the way, then sent him on his way. He first discovered an old woman, who was faster than even Gangnim. When Gangnim finally caught her and gave her a siru-tteok, she revealed her identity as Jowangsin, then told him to follow a road to the west.

Gangnim continued until the road forked into ninety-nine trails. There, three immortals were playing a game of Baduk. Gangnim gave each immortal a siru-tteok, and they advised him to wait until a vividly clothed man came this way.

The immortals vanished and Gangnim saw a fierce man with vivid clothes, holding a red paper in his hands was coming towards him. He was Haewonmaek, the original reaper of souls.

When Haewonmaek sighted the siru-tteok, he voraciously devoured it. He then saw Gangnim, and said; "I am in debt to you. What do you want?" Gangnim answered that he wished to know the trail to the Underworld. Haewonmaek showed Gangnim the trail that Yeomra used.

Gangnim followed the trail until he reached a vast river. It was the Henggi river, which formed the border of the Underworld. Many of the dead, who could not pay the ferryman, strolled around aimlessly around the river. (these are called Gaekgwi, meaning Wandering Ghosts) Gangnim gave up his last siru-tteok to pay the ferryman to take him and all the Gaekgwi across the Henggi river.

Gangnim searched for Yeomra in the Underworld. He finally fell asleep until he was awakened by a booming noise; the march of Yeomra and his soldiers to the Siwang Maji ritual, held in the realm of the mortals. Gangnim slew the soldiers of Yeomra, and destroyed Yeomra's chariot. The frightened Yeomra asked Gangnim if he would go to the Siwang Maji ritual with him. Gangnim accepted.

Amidst the Siwang Maji ritual, Yeomra escapes. Gangnim turns into a falcon and sees an owl on a sotdae. Gangnim attacks the owl who turns back into Yeomra, and promises he would go to Gimchi that afternoon. He then grabbed Gangnim's throat and threw him back to Gimchi. Gangnim's throat bulged because of Yeomra, which is why men have Adam's apples.

Gangnim returned to his mother's house in Gimchi, and waited until Yeomra descended. Yeomra entered with a thundering shake, and ripped Gwayangsaengi's wife into pieces. He threw her soul into a realm of serpents. He then drained the waters of the Kkachi Well, and made the three princes of King Beomul the Siwang, three of the ten judges of the Underworld. (The other seven are the three sons of Princess Bari, the three Chogong brothers, and Yeomra himself)

Yeomra asked the official of Gimchi if he wanted Gangnim's body or the soul. At the time, the people were unaware that the soul existed, and as a result, the official chose the body. Gangnim's body then crumpled, and Gangnim became the new Jeoseung Chasa, replacing Haewonmaek.

== Minor plot ==
Two other stories concerning Gangnim after he became a god also appears in the Chasa Bonpuli.

1. Gangnim had the mission to capture Samani, who had bribed Haewonmaek to live for 40,000 years. (See Menggam bon-puri myth) Gangnim knelt down and began to wash charcoal on a river. When people asked him why he was doing that, Gangnim answered that it was because the charcoal would turn white if he washed it for a hundred years. One day, an old man laughed at Gangnim's explanation and said; "I have lived for 40,000 years, yet I have never heard such a thing." Gangnim then caught Samani and brought him to the Underworld, where he, too, became a god.
2. Gangnim had to reap the dead when a man was 70 years old, and when a woman was 80 years old. One day, Gangnim asked a crow to reap the souls for him. The crow took the book that had the lifespans of the dead. When the crow saw a dead horse lying on the road, it dropped the book to eat the horse meat. A rat snake crawled out and ate the book. From then on, the snake had the privilege of dying eight times, and yet being reborn eight times. When the crow noticed the book was gone, it blamed a hawk on a nearby tree. The hawk and crow fought viciously, and still do to this day. The crow finally cried out; "Parents, die when your children do. Children, die when your parents do. Men, die when your wives do. Women, die when your husbands do." When Gangnim discovered that the crow had lost the book, he crushed its legs, which is why crows have bent legs.

== Ritual uses ==
All Bonpuli myths are part of larger rituals. The Chasa Bonpuli is a part of the Siwangmaji ritual, which is itself a part of the Keungut ceremony. The Siwangmaji is a ritual that honors all death gods, and the Chasa Bonpuli seeks to appease Gangnim so that he may lengthen a person's given life, and also that he may offer kindness to those that he reaps. The recital of the Chasa Bonpuli is in the form of an epic song, and the shaman (Simbang), wearing the robe of farmers, recites the epic along the rhythm of a drum-like instrument called Janggu. The Chasa Bonpuli appears in all major reports of the Keungut ceremony, and is also recited in the Gwiyang Puli, a mourning ritual.

== Features ==
Not like any other narrative, Chasa Bonpuri mentions a variety of references to the origins of the rite. In the Chasa Bonpuri, Gangnim who goes the underworld is particularly important, and through his journey, it depicts the paths of the underworld that existed only in imagination. Chasa Bonpuri is explaining why human death has become disorder in relation to the origin of death, and focusing the role of the authority or ability of the reapers, such as Gangnim.

== Comparisons with other myths ==
The Chasa Bonpuli bears the most similarity to the Jimgajegut myth, recited in the northernmost Hamgyeong Province. In the Jimgajegut myth, a man named Son goes to the Underworld to find the reasons for the mysterious death of the three triplets of Jimgaje. Although they are from the respective north and south of the country, the Jimgajegut's plot is almost identical to the Chasa Bonpuli.
