= Samgong bon-puri =

Korean shamanic narrative from Jeju Island

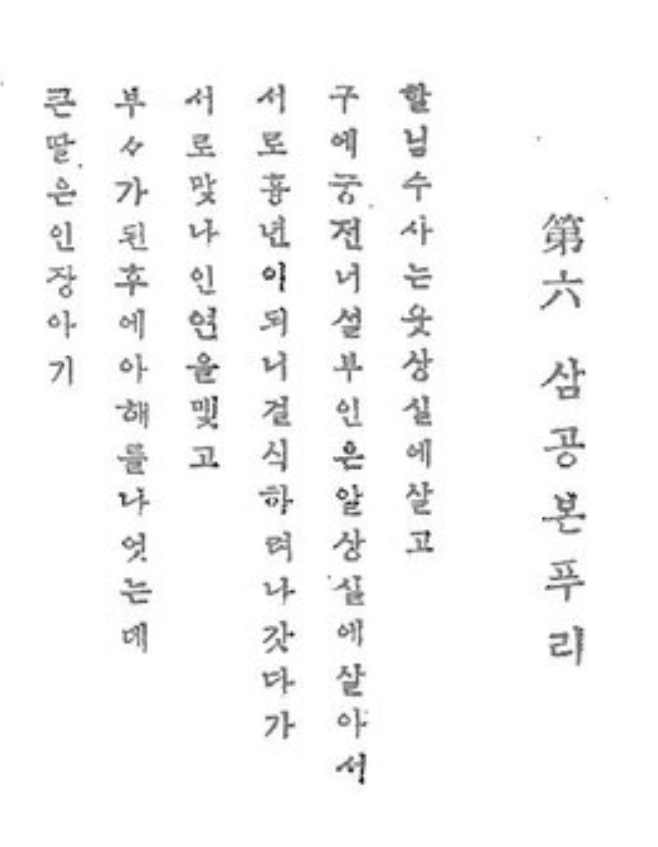
- First six lines of the first known transcription of the Samgong bon-puri, published in 1937.

Korean name
- Hangul: 삼공본풀이
- Hanja: 三公本풀이
- Revised Romanization: Samgong bon-puri
- McCune–Reischauer: Samgong pon-p'uri

The Samgong bon-puri (Korean: 삼공본풀이) is a Korean shamanic narrative recited in southern Jeju Island, associated with the goddess Samgong. It is among the most important of the twelve general bon-puri, which are the narratives known by all Jeju shamans.

The myth centers on a girl named Gameunjang-agi, the third and youngest daughter of two beggars. Her parents become very rich after her birth. One day, they ask their daughters the reason for their good fortune. Gameunjang-agi is expelled for crediting her own linea nigra instead of her parents. When her sisters chase her away from the house, Gameunjang-agi turns them into a centipede and a mushroom. Soon after, her parents go blind, lose all their wealth, and return to being beggars. Gameunjang-agi joins a family of impoverished yam gatherers and marries their good-hearted youngest son. The next day, she discovers that her husband's yam fields are full of gold and silver. After becoming rich again, she holds a feast for beggars which her parents attend, oblivious of the fact that their daughter is hosting them. At the end of the feast, Gameunjang-agi reveals her identity and restores her parents' sight.

Gameunjang-agi is worshipped as Samgong, the goddess of jeonsang: a concept roughly equivalent to human destiny. In this religious context, the Samgong bon-puri narrative demonstrates how the goddess assigns a propitious destiny to the good-hearted who respect her and an unfavorable one to the evil-minded who do not. The myth may reflect the proactive, self-driven ethics upheld by Korean shamanism. Many scholars have also noted that the figure of Gameunjang-agi subverts traditional patriarchal expectations of women. While the narrative per se exists only in Jeju Island, a very similar folktale is told in mainland Korea, albeit without religious significance. Similar stories are also known in Buddhist mythology and among the minorities of the southern Chinese highlands.

== Narrative ==
As oral literature, Korean shamanic narratives have no fixed form but exist in multiple divergent versions. In the case of the Samgong bon-puri, thirteen versions were known to researchers as of 2018, transcribed between the 1930s and the 2010s. The story in all versions is similar. The summary below is based primarily on a recitation by the shaman An Sa-in (transcription first published in 1980), often considered the "exemplary version" due to its narrative coherence.

Two beggars (Note: A male beggar named Gang'iyeongseong'iseobul and a female beggar named Hong'eunsocheongung'egungjeon'gungnap) marry and have three daughters: Eunjang-agi, named after silver (Korean eun); Notjang-agi, named after bronze (Korean not); and Gameunjang-agi, the youngest. (Note: The narrative states that the townsfolk gave Eunjang-agi food in a silver bowl and Notjang-agi food in a bronze bowl, explaining their names. Gameunjang-agi is said to have been fed with a wooden (nam) bowl, but the word is not obviously connected to the figure's name.) Once the latter is born, the family becomes fabulously rich. When Gameunjang-agi is fifteen years old, the parents ask their daughters who they credit for their good fortune. The two older daughters credit their parents, but Gameunjang-agi claims that the family is prosperous by virtue of the linea nigra that connects her navel and her genitals. Irritated, her parents tell her to leave the house.

Soon after, her parents regret what they have said and tell their older daughters to bring their sister back home. But the sisters lie, telling Gameunjang-agi that her parents are coming out to beat her and that she should run away. The youngest sister then turns Eunjang-agi into a centipede and Notjang-agi into a mushroom. When all three daughters fail to return, the parents decide to leave the house to see for themselves, only to crash into the doorframe and go blind. They then lose all their fortune and return to being beggars. In another version, Gameunjang-agi actively causes her parents' blindness by throwing a handful of dust at their eyes, and then summon deities that destroy all of her family's properties.

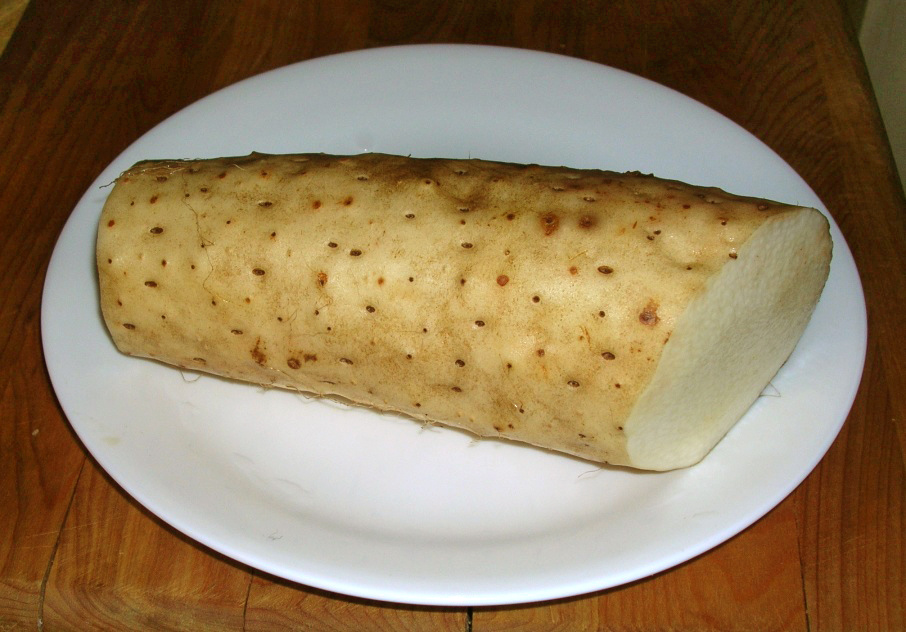
A Chinese yam tuber with the tips removed

Gameunjang-agi lodges at the shack of an impoverished old couple whose three sons make a living by gathering tubers of yam. Upon returning, the two older sons insult their parents for wasting their money by hosting a girl and give them only the tips of the yams to eat, but the youngest brother is happy to see Gameunjang-agi and gives his parents the best parts of his yams. When Gameunjang-agi steams rice for her hosts, the older brothers insult her and refuse to eat, but the youngest eats with gusto. That night, Gameunjang-agi bathes the youngest son, gives him new clothes, and marries him.

The next day, the newlywed couple visits the yam fields. There is only feces in the oldest brother's fields and snakes and other animals in the middle brother's fields, but Gameunjang-agi discovers that her husband's fields are full of gold and silver nuggets that he mistook to be stones. Having become rich again, Gameunjang-agi holds a feast for beggars, hoping to see her parents again. Her parents attend, unaware that their daughter is hosting them. Gameunjang-agi makes sure that they are deprived of food until every other beggar has eaten their fill and left. She then pours them wine as they sing the story of their life since their marriage, repeating the early parts of the narrative in musical form. This song is called nolle. Once they have finished singing, the daughter reveals her identity. The parents then miraculously regain their sight. In some versions (but not An's), Gameunjang-agi also reveals to her parents that she is a divine being:

"I have come into the human world to take charge of human destiny [jeonsang]. When you lived as rich people, it was because I was there."

== Ritual context and religious significance ==
The Samgong bon-puri is one of twelve "general bon-puri", which are narratives featuring deities worshipped throughout Jeju Island, and which are recited by all Jeju shamans. It is one of the three most important myths out of the twelve, together with the Chogong bon-puri and the Igong bon-puri. It is recited in the Great Gut, the most sacred sequence of ceremonies in Jeju religion. Out of the thirty-one component procedures of the Great Gut, the shaman's full recital of the Samgong bon-puri narrative—which occurs immediately after the Igong-maji ceremony—constitutes the fourteenth ritual. The Samgong-maji ceremony, in which the narrative is summarized another time and physically reenacted, is the twentieth component ritual.

Masked shamans entering while reenacting the blindness of Gameunjang-agi's parents, in the Samgong-maji

The deity invoked through the recitation of the narrative and in the Samgong-maji is Gameunjang-agi, who is worshipped as the goddess Samgong (lit. 'Third lord'), the divinity in charge of a concept called jeonsang. The precise meaning of this word is unclear, but it has been translated as "the principles by which all things in the world are done, including having a job or becoming rich or falling ill." It is often glossed as roughly equivalent to the notion of "fate" or "destiny." Shamans refer to both "good jeonsang," such as becoming rich, and "bad jeonsang," such as becoming blind. Jeonsang with such value judgement applied is called sarok.

In the Samgong-maji ceremony, one shaman summarizes the Samgong bon-puri narrative while two other shamans enter with walking sticks, dressed as beggars and reenacting the blindness of Gameunjang-agi's parents. When wine is offered to these two shamans, they open their eyes, as the parents do in the myth. The shaman dressed as the father then begins beating his surroundings, including the assembled worshippers, with his walking stick while repeating refrains such as "O sarok, o sarok!" and "Let us cast out blue sarok, black sarok, blindness-causing sarok." The shaman dressed as the mother then ties a woven reed seat to her front and asks the worshippers for offerings, while the other shaman beats her with his stick. The two shamans alternate between beating the other and being beaten until eventually, the seat is thrown out of the front gate of the house. The shamans thus accomplish the ritual expulsion of inauspicious jeonsang.

Gameunjang-agi is referenced by her personal name in the Samgong-maji, and shamans explicitly beseech the goddess to "send out rough jeonsang and establish good jeonsang," honoring her as the "Bridge of jeonsang". Seen in this ritual context, Gameunjang-agi's role in the myth is to assign a favorable jeonsang for the kind-hearted humans who respect her, such as the youngest brother, and to bring ruin and ill fortune for the evil-minded and those who disrespect her, such as her sisters. Folklorist Lee Soo-ja accordingly characterizes Samgong as a divinity who "changes destiny by determining the shape of human lives according to the mindset that they have."

Folklorist Kim Young-suk points out that the Samgong bon-puri centers on how the goddess demonstrates her power in the human world. From the moment of her birth, the goddess deprives her parents of their customary economic authority. The latter's questioning of their daughters is motivated by a desire to reclaim this authority, but Gameunjang-agi dismisses it out of hand. Her disrespect for her parents marks her as standing above the norms of human society. The subsequent destruction of the family demonstrates the fate of those who would challenge the gods, with the parents' blindness a physical symbol of the hubris and ignorance that doom them. But in her dealings with the youngest brother, the goddess shows the rewards that accrue to those who accept divine authority. Finally, by restoring her parents' sight after depriving them of food, she acts as a spiritual guide who leads humans to acceptance of and communion with the gods through a process of initiation. The happy resolution of the conflict between the goddess and her human parents exemplifies a harmonious relationship between the human and the divine and completes the establishment of Samgong's authority in the human world.

== Theories and interpretations ==
=== As reflections of shamanic worldview ===
The Samgong bon-puri has been analyzed as exemplifying aspects of the Korean shamanic worldview and morality. Jeong Je-ho suggests that the narrative supports the religious emphasis on proactive behavior seen in other myths such as the life replacement narratives. Gameunjang-agi possesses the ability to effortlessly bring about wealth, but not acceptance from her family. Once she is expelled from the house, she makes efforts to bring about interpersonal as well as material happiness, such as by involving her husband in the discovery of the gold and silver and by actively seeking out her parents and restoring their sight. It is only after founding a new family and restoring her original one that she is able to reveal her position as the goddess of destiny. According to Jeong, the narrative affirms that a truly fortunate destiny is the result of effort and not simply inherent fortune.

Shin Tae-soo notes that Gameunjang-agi's behavior, in which she denies her parents' authority and murders her sisters but is nonetheless worshipped as a goddess, is at odds with the mainstream Confucian virtue of filial piety. According to Shin, the Samgong bon-puri seeks to affirm the superiority of the ethical system of Korean shamanism, in which obedience towards parents and solidarity with the family is contingent on accordance with divine and cosmic principles, over the hierarchical Confucian value system. The confrontation between the girl and her parents thus personifies a confrontation between shamanism and Confucianism. Shin also argues that Gameunjang-agi identifying herself as the source of her fortune rather than an external cause reflects a shamanic insistence on the importance of self-driven action compared to the Neo-Confucian focus on social regulation and moral discipline, and that her charitable work seen in the beggars' feast and her curing of her parents' ignorance and blindness reveal shamanic definitions of righteous conduct.

=== Feminist interpretations ===
Both the shamans and the worshippers of Korean shamanism were traditionally predominantly women. Many studies of the Samgong bon-puri are accordingly informed by a feminist framework and focus on the narrative's subversion of patriarchy. Korean society conventionally associated women with sentimentality, passivity, and selfless sacrifice, suiting their subordinate relationship to men. But Gameunjang-agi openly affirms her worth as a woman before her parents and leaves the family house, which is a symbolic space dominated by the conventional patriarchal order that does not accept her. She plays the active role throughout the rest of the story, consistently following her own desires rather than those of the men and showing none of the self-sacrifice or patient endurance expected of women. The myth concludes when the parents themselves enter the house built with the gold she found—a space where Gameunjang-agi plays the dominant role—and come to accept their daughter's independence and ability. The goddess thus defies patriarchy by demonstrating women's intrinsic value independent of men.

Folklorist Shin Yeon-woo compares the role of female figures in the Chogong, Igong, and Samgong bon-puri, recited consecutively in the Great Gut. As the ritual proceeds, the women become increasingly proactive. Noga-danpung-agassi of the Chogong bon-puri is only passively acted on by supernatural forces. Wongang-ami of the Igong bon-puri is more active in that she unsuccessfully resists an evil man who desires to rape her. Gameunjang-agi dominates the final narrative. Shin suggests that the three consecutive myths combine to present a coherent perspective on women's lives. The Chogong bon-puri establishes the supernatural forces that govern women's lives; the Igong bon-puri portrays in detail the human evils that women suffer from; and the final Samgong bon-puri shows that these evils can be overcome by affirming one's self-worth as a woman, as Gameunjang-agi does.

The Samgong bon-puri portrays a woman as personifying the fortune of the household, whether for her parents or her husband. This reflects a view of women as bringers of fertility. This is referenced in the myth when the girl claims that her linea nigra is responsible for the family's success. The appearance or darkening of the linea nigra is an important symptom of pregnancy, and Gameunjang-agi's mention of it implies that her divine ability to bring about prosperity and fortune is directly connected to her potential as a woman to generate and bear new life.

=== Mainland and cross-cultural connections ===
While the Samgong bon-puri is found only in southern Jeju Island, there is a related folktale widespread in mainland Korea, albeit with no religious significance. In this folktale, the parents ask their three daughters who they should thank for their lives. The older sisters credit their parents, but the youngest thanks herself. The parents expel her, and she marries a poor charcoal burner. Later, they discover that the stones of the charcoal kilns are actually nuggets of gold and become rich. The couple is later joined by the daughter's parents, who have in the meantime been reduced to beggars. But the Samgong bon-puri emphasizes its heroine to a far greater degree than the folktale does for the daughter. Whereas the mainland story begins with the parents' questioning, the Jeju narrative begins with the parents' marriage and the subsequent blessing their youngest daughter bestows on them. Unlike her mainland equivalent, Gameunjang-agi wields divine authority and is the proactive figure throughout the narrative. The added focus on the heroine reflects the Jeju narrative's sacred function as the myth of an actively worshipped deity. It is possible that the mainland folktale descends from an ancient myth which was closer to the Samgong bon-puri, and which at some point lost its religious significance.

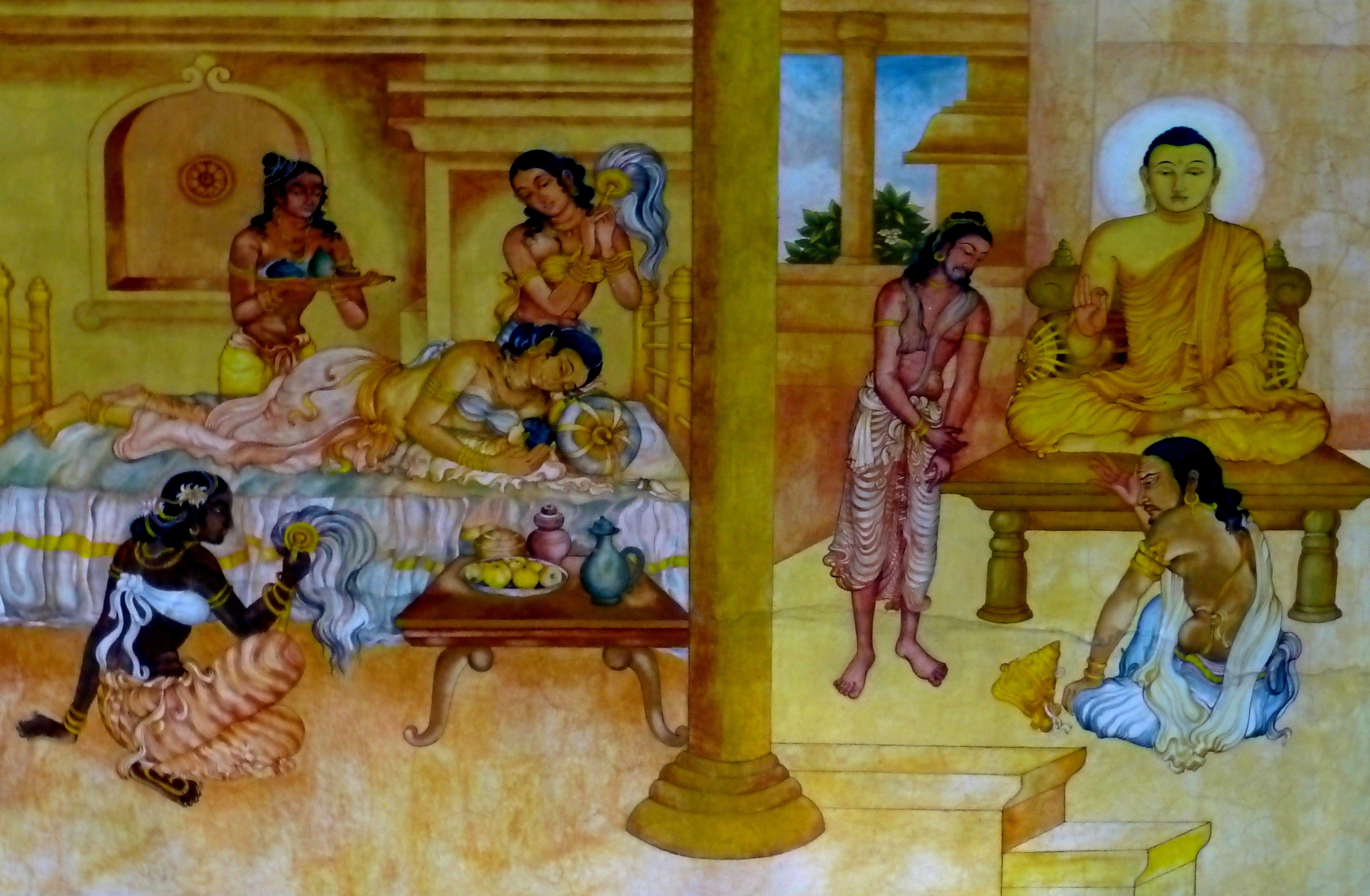
Modern Indian mural of Shakyamuni Buddha praising the daughter of Prasenajit

The mainland folktale and the Jeju Samgong bon-puri may descend from a Buddhist legend. In this story, which was known to Koreans via the fifth-century Chinese Buddhist compendium Za Baozang Jing, the Buddhist monarch Prasenajit has a beautiful and talented daughter. While the king tells her that he is the reason that she is loved and respected, the princess insists that her success is due to her own karma. The king ultimately tests her by marrying her to the poorest beggar in the capital. She does so, and soon discovers a great quantity of buried treasure. The princess and the beggar become as rich as Prasenajit himself. Astounded, the king visits Shakyamuni Buddha and learns that his daughter had indeed accumulated much good karma in her previous lives by serving the Vipasyin and Kasyapa Buddhas.

Very similar myths are told by the Miao, Zhuang, and Dai peoples of southern China. In these as well, a third daughter is expelled from a rich family when she tells her father that she thanks herself for her wealthy life and not her parents. She marries a poor man—in one case, a charcoal burner—and become rich after fortunately discovering gold or silver. In one of the myths, her father is later reduced to a beggar. He visits the house of his daughter, not knowing who its owner is, and is hosted by her. After the humiliation of being fed by his abandoned daughter, the man kills himself to save face and becomes the god of thunder. These myths may also share a common source with the Korean stories.

The thirteenth-century Korean history Samguk yusa features a legend about the seventh-century King Mu of the ancient kingdom of Baekje, who was said to originally have been a poor yam gatherer. When he heard that the daughter of King Jinpyeong of the neighboring kingdom of Silla was very beautiful, he went to the Silla capital and taught the local children a song claiming that the princess was his lover. When the song reached the court, the king expelled the princess. Mu tracked her down and married her. Upon returning to Baekje, the princess discovered that her new husband's yam field was full of gold whose value he had been unaware of. The Silla princess's discovery of gold in her husband's yam fields closely parallels Gameunjang-agi's discovery of the same, and the princess's expulsion for sexual impropriety has been compared to the goddess's expulsion for staking a claim to sexual power through her linea nigra. A major difference is that the woman is the protagonist of the Samgong bon-puri, whereas the man is the hero of the Samguk yusa legend. Still, this thirteenth-century story and the modern Samgong bon-puri may stem from a single source.
