= Bon-puri =

Korean shamanic narratives from Jeju

- Hangul: 본풀이
- Hanja: 本풀이
- RR: bonpuri
- MR: ponp'uri

The bon-puri (Jeju and Korean: 본풀이 bon-puri, lit. 'origin narration') are Korean shamanic narrative recited in the shamanic rituals of Jeju Island, to the south of the Korean Peninsula. Similar shamanic narratives are known in mainland Korea as well, but are only occasionally referred to as bon-puri.

The bon-puri is a formalistic genre of syllabic verse that tells the story of how the deity or deities being invoked came to hold their divine position. Their recitation is believed to please the gods and encourage their participation. There are three primary types of bon-puri. The general bon-puri, of which there are twelve, involve deities who are worshipped throughout the island, such as the goddess of childbirth or Gangnim the psychopomp. The village-shrine bon-puri number more than seventy, and center on patron gods of specific communities. The ancestral bon-puri, which are the least understood, feature the patron gods of specific family lineages or occupations, although the god is not necessarily an ancestor. There is a small group of bon-puri narratives which are no longer performed by shamans and which do not clearly belong to one of the three above. These are called special bon-puri.

== Etymology ==
Bon-puri is a compound of the Sino-Korean noun bon, meaning "origin," and puri, the nominalized form of the verb pulda "to narrate." The fundamental meaning of a bon-puri is thus the story of a deity's origins, i.e. how the deity being invoked came to hold their divine position. In some phrases pulda can also mean "to soothe," and bon-puri may have the additional nuance of being a story that pleases the gods or soothes their dissatisfaction.

== Ritual context ==
The bon-puri is always recited by shamans as part of gut rituals, where the shaman calls the gods into the human world in order to beseech their favor. Many bon-puri works explicitly state that the reason for the performance is to delight the gods and encourage their greater participation in the ritual, as in the following excerpt from the Chogong bon-puri:

귀신은 본을 풀민 신나락하는 법이옵고

생인은 본 풀민 백년원수 지는 법이웨다.

By telling a god's origins, one makes the god giddy with delight

By telling a person's origins, one makes an enemy for a hundred years.

In Jeju shamanism, humans are imperfect beings whose faults become clearer the more about them is known. By contrast, the venerated gods are exemplary beings, and to recount their deeds is to make their excellence known and thereby win their favor in the ritual.

Shamans sing bon-puri while seated before and facing the sacrificial altar, and turn their back to the people. The bon-puri is always sung to the beat of the janggu drum.

== Characteristics ==
The bon-puri is a genre of oral poetry. As no codified text exists, each shaman has their own versions of the bon-puri. However, a certain degree of consistency is expected. The ethnologist Chang Chu Keun cites one example of a Chogong bon-puri performance which was interrupted ten times by more experienced shamans, who repeatedly disputed the details given in the recitation and ultimately demanded that the performing shaman name the man who taught him. In extreme cases, the shaman may be replaced.

Bon-puri performances are initiated by an announcement to the gods that the recitation is about to begin. This is followed by a request for the gods to descend to the ritual place, then by the genealogy of the gods being invoked. The example below is from the bon-puri of the god of the village of Tosan:

일뢰한집 난수생 올립니다. 본산국데레 과광성 신풀어사옵소서... 일뢰또한집 어멍국은 웃손당 백주님, 아바님은 알손당 소천국 하르바님, 하나 두개 시개 늬개 다서 여ᄉᆞ 일고차 아들입니다.

We present the nansusaeng (Note: Another word for bon-puri) of the Great House of the Seventh Day. May you descend with full vigor to your native land... The mother of the Great House of the Seventh Day's God is Lady Baekju from the Utson shrine, and his father is Lord Grandfather Socheon-guk from the Alson shrine. First, second, third, fourth, five, sixth—he is the seventh son.

The meter of the bon-puri is based on the number of syllables. The basic meter involves a line of two four-syllable feet, but lines where the first foot has three syllables and the second foot has five syllables are also frequent. The genre is also characterized by formulaic phrases often involving parallelism or repetition, which are found identically in many different works. For instance, many village-shrine bon-puri include the following sentence word-to-word in their conclusions, describing how the protagonist became a god that governs the lives of the villagers:

안음 버은 금책에, 좀이 버은 금붓대, 삼천장 베릿돌에 일만장의 먹을 ᄀᆞᆯ려... ᄆᆞ을의 장적 호적 문세를 찾이.

With a godly book more than an armful thick and a godly brush more than a fistful thick, [the god] grinds ink for ten thousand pages in an inkstone for three thousand pages... and takes charge of the town's jangjeok and hojeok documents. (Note: In Jeju shamanism, these divine documents govern the lifespans of the town's inhabitants.)

Another stylistic feature of the bon-puri is the use of the emphatic present-tense in key moments of the narrative, marked by the verb-final suffix -go(na). This gives the impression that the story is being reenacted in the present day through the course of the ritual. The impression that the mythical past is being reenacted is strengthened by the use of long stretches of directly quoted dialogue, unbroken by narration. The example below is from the Samgong bon-puri:

"은장아가 은장아가, 너는 누구 덕에 밥을 먹고 은대영에 싯술ᄒᆞ고 놋대영에 시수를 ᄒᆞ느냐?"

"아바님도 덕입네다. 어머님도 덕입네다."

"나 ᄄᆞᆯ애기 착실하다. 네 방으로 들어가라."

"Eunjang-agi! Eunjang-agi! By whose grace do you eat rice and wash your face with silver basins, wash your face with bronze basins?"

"That is by my father's grace, and also by my mother's grace."

"Our daughter knows what's right. Go back to your room."

Many expressions in bon-puri are attested nowhere else in Jeju or Korean. For instance, the bon-puri poems refer to the guardian hounds of the gods as "the naguri of the courtyard, the naguri of the earth." The precise meaning of many such expressions is unclear.

Many bon-puri conclude by explaining the mythical reasons for specific facets of Jeju ritual life. For village-shrine bon-puri, the very last sentence is typically a formulaic invocation such as the following:

어진 한집님전 축하올립니다.

We raise our acclamation before the benevolent Lord of the Great House.

== Types ==
There are three basic types of bon-puri: general, village-shrine, and ancestral.

The twelve general bon-puri (Korean: 일반신본풀이 ilban-sin bon-puri) must be memorized by all shamans, and narrate the origins of gods who are worshipped throughout the island. The village-shrine bon-puri (당신본풀이 dang-sin bon-puri) feature the patron gods of specific villages. Shamans memorize only the bon-puri of their own village and neighboring villages, sometimes because the gods of adjacent villages are considered to be close relatives. Finally, ancestral bon-puri (조상신본풀이 josang-sin bon-puri) involve deities (sometimes deified historical individuals) that are the patrons of a specific family or occupation. Ancestral bon-puri are memorized only by shamans who belong to the relevant family.

Five bon-puri are commonly classified as special bon-puri (특수신본풀이 teuksu-sin bon-puri) because they do not fit neatly into the categories above and have unclear ritual significance. Shamans no longer recite any of the special bon-puri.

=== General bon-puri ===
There are twelve general bon-puri works.

1. Cheonji-wang bon-puri: The Jeju creation myth. In most versions, the creator god Cheonji-wang descends into the human world, either because the world had two suns and two moons which made life unlivable, or to punish the impiety of a man named Sumyeong-jangja. Cheonji-wang then sleeps with an earthly woman, who gives birth to the twins Daebyeol-wang and Sobyeol-wang. The twins ascend into heaven, meet their father, and engage in a flower-growing contest to decide who will rule the living. The benevolent twin Daebyeol-wang wins, but the malevolent Sobyeol-wang switches the flowers while his brother sleeps. Sobyeol-wang thus becomes the ruler of the living and is responsible for evil on earth. The doubled sun and moon are either destroyed by the twins together, or by Daebyeol-wang alone when his brother comes begging for help in ruling the living.
2. Samseung-halmang bon-puri: Like Daebyeol-wang and Sobyeol-wang, two deities engage in a flower contest, but in this myth there is no cheating. The goddess who grows the better flowers becomes the goddess of childbirth and young children and establishes the Seocheon flower fields, whose flowers govern life, death, and human emotion. The loser becomes the goddess of dead children who sends disease to infants to kill them.
3. Manura bon-puri: In a sort of sequel to the Samsung-halmang bon-puri, the childbirth goddess pleads the smallpox god to not harm the children. The latter insults her for being a woman and horribly disfigures the children. The goddess then refuses to allow the smallpox god's wife to give birth, causing her excruciating pain as the child grows inside her. The smallpox god begs for mercy, and the goddess allows his wife to give birth.
4. Chogong bon-puri: Triplets are born to the scandalous liaison of a nobleman's daughter and a Buddhist priest. The triplets grow to be talented young men who all pass the civil service examinations. Three thousand Confucian scholars, envious of their success, cancel their grades in the examinations and murder or imprison their mother. At the end of a quest, the triplets invent the shamanic rituals and become the first shamans. They use their shamanic powers to resurrect or free their mother, who becomes the ritual mother of all future shamans. After the triplets die, they become judges of the sins of the dead.
5. Igong bon-puri: The gods appoint a man as the governor of the flower fields of Seocheon. The man's wife is too pregnant for the full journey, and she is left behind in the house of a rich man to give birth to a son named Hallakgung'i. The rich man attempts to seduce the wife. When she refuses, he employs both her and her son as slaves. When Hallakgung'i escapes to Seocheon at the age of fifteen, the man kills his mother in rage. Hallakgung'i uses the flower of evil thought to kill the rich man and his family and the flowers of life to resurrect his mother. Hallakgung'i succeeds his father as the ruler of Seocheon, while his mother takes care of children there.
6. Samgong bon-puri: Two beggars become fabulously rich soon after their third daughter is born. One day, they ask their daughters who they credit for their fortune. The older two daughters say their parents, but the youngest daughter thanks her own linea nigra. Her parents tell her to leave the house but soon regret it, and tell their older daughters to bring their youngest sister back. The sisters lie and tell her to stay away; they then turn into mushrooms and centipedes. The parents go blind, lose all their wealth, and become beggars again. Meanwhile, the third daughter marries a kind-hearted taro farmer, then discovers that her husband's taro fields are full of gold. The couple becomes rich and holds a feast for beggars. The parents come to the feast, realize that their daughter is there, and miraculously regain their sight. The youngest daughter explains that she is the goddess of jeonsang.
7. Chasa bon-puri: A woman's three sons all fall dead the day they pass their civil service examinations. The ruler orders a man named Gangnim to capture Yama, the King of Death, so that the woman may know why her sons died. Gangnim journeys into the realm of the dead and meets Yama, who agrees to visit Gangnim's country. Yama reveals that the woman's sons were the reincarnations of three princes that the woman had murdered, who decided to be reborn as her sons and fall dead in order to cause her grief, and makes Gangnim his servant who conducts the spirits of the dead to his realm.
8. Samani bon-puri (also called Menggam bon-puri): A man named Saman discovers an abandoned skull in the hills and worships it as an ancestor. One day, the skull warns him that he is about to die and gives him advice on how to cheat the gods of death. With the help of the skull, Saman lives for three thousand or forty thousand years.
9. Segyeong bon-puri: The longest bon-puri. Jacheong-bi is a girl who is born instead of a son due to a Buddhist priest's curse. Over the course of the narrative, she falls in love with a heavenly being named Mun-doryeong, marries him, and resurrects him when he is killed; kills and resurrects her servant Jeongsu-nam; marries a princess of Seocheon while dressed as a man; and suppresses a rebellion in the realm of the gods. Jeongsu-nam, Mun-doryeong, and Jacheong-bi later all become gods of agriculture.
10. Chilseong bon-puri: When the daughter of a nobleman becomes illicitly pregnant with seven children, her parents imprison her in an iron box and throw her into the sea. The iron box floats to Jeju Island, where seven women and a man open it and find eight snakes inside. They throw the box away, disgusted by the snakes, and are struck with incurable illnesses. The shamans tell them that they have mistreated gods from a foreign land, and the eight hold the first rituals to placate the snake gods. Their illnesses vanish and they become prosperous. The village of Hamdeok begins to worship the snake gods and becomes rich, and eventually all of Jeju comes to venerate them as the goddesses of wealth.
11. Munjeon bon-puri: An evil woman kills the mother of seven brothers and takes her place in the family. When the children (or only the seventh youngest brother) realize that their mother has been replaced, the woman convinces the father of the family that she, as his wife, is deadly ill and will need to eat the children's (or seventh brother's) livers to be cured. The seventh brother thwarts the woman's schemes, dismembers her body, and uses the flowers of Seocheon to resurrect their dead mother. The entire family (including the evil stepmother) becomes the gods of the household, with the seventh brother becoming the god of the gate and his mother the goddess of the kitchen.
12. Jijang bon-puri: Perhaps the most unusual myth in the genre. When the girl Jijang is four years old, her grandparents die; when she is five, her father dies; when she is six, her mother dies. She is mistreated at her uncle's house until she marries at the age of fifteen into a happy family and gives birth to a son. But at sixteen, her grandparents-in-law die. Her father-in-law, her mother-in-law, her husband, and her son all die in turn, and her husband's family has been exterminated by the time she is nineteen. She holds a large-scale gut for all the people that her presence has killed. Jijang then dies and turns into birds that the shamans must shoo away.

=== Village-shrine bon-puri ===
There are over three hundred village shrines in Jeju Island. However, as many as ninety separate shrines can worship the same deity, while many shrines have no associated bon-puri. Only between seventy and eighty village-shrine bon-puri therefore exist. Village-shrine bon-puri have six narrative elements, and are categorized into five types depending on how many of these elements appear. The six elements are given below.

1. A carnivorous hunting god emerges from a local hill.
2. A rice-eating agricultural goddess arrives from overseas, often Seoul, China, heaven, the oceans, or a mythical land. Some goddesses appear as snakes. The Chilseong bon-puri was probably originally the bon-puri of the village of Hamdeok, whose worship was adopted throughout the island.
3. The two gods marry. The goddess often encourages the god to abandon hunting and adopt farming.
4. The gods divorce, generally due to incompatible eating habits. In the important bon-puri of Songdang shrine, the goddess encourages her husband to plow the earth and divorces him when he devours all the plowing oxen. The bon-puri narrative usually strongly supports the agricultural goddess over the carnivorous husband.
5. The son of the two gods engages in martial adventures abroad, such as slaying a four-headed barbarian in the service of the Emperor of China, and himself becomes a god of a third village.
6. The god or gods become the patron of the village. In some bon-puri, the gods shoot arrows and take charge of the place where their arrows land. In others, the god casts curses upon the village until their presence is recognized and they are offered worship, or encourages the villagers to move the settlement to a place that suits the god better.

The five types are:

1. Incipient (태동형 taedong-hyeong): Though referred to as bon-puri, these works have no narrative, only a list of place names and theonyms.
2. Origin-narrating (기원형 giwon-hyeong): These bon-puri feature only elements (1) or (2), and the deity is assumed to have been worshipped since the village's founding.
3. Basic (기본형 gibon-hyeong): These bon-puri feature either element (1) or element (2), as well as element (6).
4. Developing (성장형 seongjang-hyeong): These bon-puri feature elements (1), (2), (3), and (6). The myth of the Samseonghyeol is a typical example of the type.
5. Complete (완성형 wanseong-hyeong): These bon-puri feature all six elements, and are reserved for the largest and most sacred shrines.

Many village-shrine bon-puri posit their gods to be kin of other gods. Songdang shrine, whose two gods have a dedicated complete bon-puri, is crucial to this network because the Songdang gods are thought to have had eighteen sons, twenty-eight daughters, and 378 grandchildren, all of whom became patrons of various villages.

In one extremely unusual village-shrine bon-puri, the patrons of the village are believed to be Daebyeol-wang and Sobyeol-wang, the twin protagonists of the Cheonji-wang bon-puri. This does not fit into any of the categories above.

=== Ancestral bon-puri ===
The ancestral bon-puri are dedicated to the patron gods of families and occupations, who are often not actually perceived as ancestors. For example, the bon-puri of the god Yeongdeung, associated with fishing, is performed only by shamans whose families are fishermen. The identity of the deity that is worshipped varies. Some families worship historical ancestors, while others worship snakes, dokkaebi, crones, or young girls. Because they are traditionally known only by shamans from within the family, they are not well-understood by outsiders.

=== Special bon-puri ===
There are five special bon-puri.

- Woncheon'gang bon-puri: Two unrelated narratives share this name. The Woncheon'gang is a divination book traditionally used in Jeju.
  - One version is about an orphaned girl named Onal (lit. 'today') who embarks on a long journey to the land of Woncheon'gang to find her parents. After her return, she makes people copy down the Woncheon'gang.
  - Another version is about a woman who is tricked into betraying her husband. As her husband leaves, he makes her read the Woncheon'gang.
- Semin-hwangje bon-puri: Emperor Taizong of Tang dies and finds that his account in the realm of the dead is in great debt due to his many sins. He repays his debt by borrowing from the accounts of an impoverished couple who have done only good in their lives, and who are still alive. After escaping back to the living world, the emperor finds the couple and repays with interest the money he had borrowed from them in the realm of the dead.
- Heogung-aegi bon-puri: The realm of the living and dead were once connected, and the dead could return to the living world every night. A young mother named Heogung-aegi dies but visits her family every night to take care of her young children. One day, she fails to return. In one version, she is imprisoned by a giantess; in another version, she is hidden by her family. Gangnim, who is sent to retrieve her, severs Heogung-aegi's soul from her body and leaves the corpse behind. From then on, the dead leave their bodies behind, and the physical connection between the living and dead worlds is severed to prevent similar cases.
- Samdu-gumi bon-puri: An old matchmaker promises a young woman that he will find a good husband for her, then tells her to eat one of his (or another human's) legs. When she refuses, he kills her. The woman's younger sister is similarly killed for refusing to eat the old man's leg. The youngest sister agrees to eat his leg, and the man tells her that he loves people who will eat human legs and hates unboiled eggs, willow branches, and iron, because they will defeat his magic. The matchmaker later takes his true form as a three-headed, nine-tailed monster, but the girl uses eggs, willow branches, and iron to kill him. She buries her murdered sisters and grinds the monster's body to powder so it will not return.

== See also ==
- Korean mythology
