= Semin-hwangje bon-puri =

Korean shamanic narrative of Jeju Island

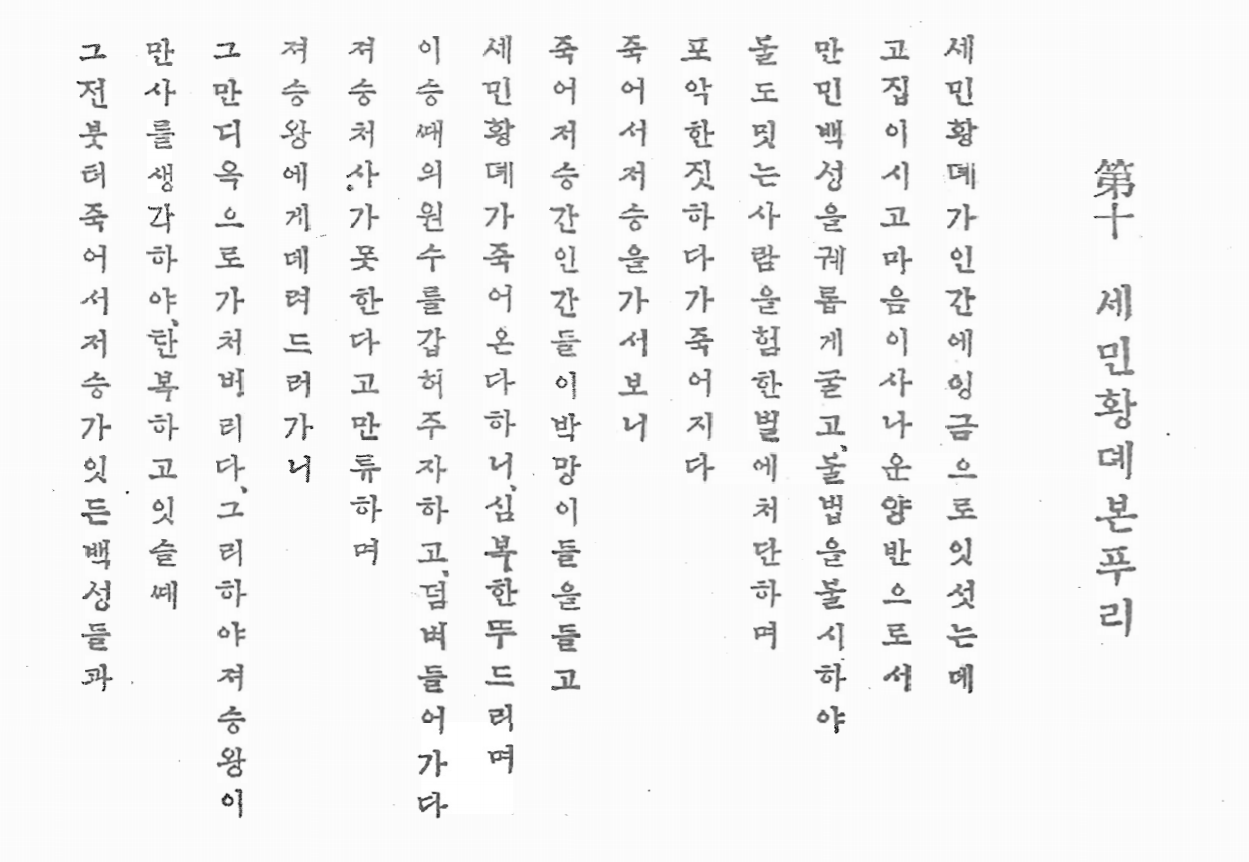
- First page of the transcription of the 1931 version

Korean name
- Hangul: 세민황제본풀이
- Hanja: 世民皇帝本풀이
- Revised Romanization: Semin-hwangje bon-puri
- McCune–Reischauer: Semin-hwangje pon-p'uri

The Semin-hwangje bon-puri is a Korean shamanic narrative formerly recited in southern Jeju Island during the funeral ceremonies. As it is no longer transmitted by the oral tradition, it is classified as one of the special bon-puri.

Two versions of the myth are known. In the older version recited in 1931, the tyrannical Chinese emperor Taizong of Tang dies and is obliged to compensate those he had taken unjustly from while alive. However, his afterlife vaults are virtually empty, as he has given so little to charity while alive. The emperor pays off his victims by borrowing from the rich afterlife vaults of a couple named Maeil and Jangsang, and is then allowed to return to the living world. The resurrected emperor disguises himself as a beggar and observes Maeil and Jangsang's good works firsthand. He resolves to live a moral life, sends a monk to retrieve the Buddhist canon from the divine realm of Sukhavati, and takes Maeil and Jangsang as his mentors. The much shorter and rather disorganized 1961 version begins with a discussion of Maeil and Jangsang's charity and ends with the two building a bridge to the afterlife, with Taizong only appearing in the middle of the story.

The Semin-hwangje bon-puri is a shamanic adaptation of the Tale of Tang Taizong, a Korean Buddhist novel itself inspired by a small portion of the sixteenth-century Chinese novel Journey to the West. The 1931 version is much closer to the Buddhist source than the 1961 version, but both diverge somewhat from the original novel—such as by emphasizing the role of Taizong as more of a human individual than as an emperor—in order to better fit the new shamanic context. The narrative also shows influence from other shamanic narratives and from folktales.

== Narrative ==
As is typical of Korean shamanic narratives and oral literature more generally, the Semin-hwangje bon-puri exists in multiple versions. Researchers have transcribed two of them, one recited in 1931 and the other in 1961. As oral transmission of the myth has ended, no discoveries of other versions can be expected through further fieldwork. It is accordingly classified as one of the "special bon-puri," a term used to refer to narratives which are no longer in oral transmission and are known only from very few transcriptions, and whose ritual context and purpose are thus incompletely understood.

=== Bak Bong-chun's version ===
Emperor Taizong of Tang

Bak Bong-chun (1901–1957)'s version was recited in 1931 and published in 1937 by the Japanese ethnographers Chijō Akamatsu and Takashi Akiba.

The seventh-century Chinese emperor Taizong of Tang, referred to throughout the narrative as Semin-hwangje "Emperor Semin" after his given name Shimin (Sino-Korean Semin), is a cruel tyrant who persecutes Buddhism and torments his subjects. When he dies and is taken to the world of the dead, the dead who suffered under the emperor's rule appeal to the King of the Dead to avenge their torment at his hands. The King orders Taizong brought forth and tells him to make compensations.

In order to repay the people he took unjustly from, Taizong checks his vault in the afterlife. There is nothing but a bundle of straw inside: the same bundle that he gave to an old man in his youth. That bundle was the only thing that the emperor has willingly given to others while alive. Taizong is forced to borrow money from the vaults of a couple named Maeil and Jangsang, whose afterlife vaults are full of riches. Once he has compensated his victims, the King of the Dead orders him to do good works while alive, and tells the emperor to follow a straight road while ignoring the advice of a spotted calf and a white puppy. Having done so, he falls into a pond by which he returns to the world of the living.

Having been resurrected, Taizong orders his ministers to find Maeil and Jangsang, who make shoes and run a tavern for a living. The emperor disguises as a beggar to visit them. First, he buys three cups of liquor. He realizes that the prices they offer are half those of other taverns. Second, he goes to their shoe shop to buy a pair, and they give him another pair for free. Finally, he asks them to lend him ten cash coins, but they give him the money for free. The emperor realizes that their vaults in the afterlife are so rich because they give to others so willingly in life.

The repentant emperor assembles his court and asks them how one can do good works. The chancellor suggests that he go find the Tripiṭaka or Buddhist canon. The emperor orders a monk named Hoin to go to Sukhavati to retrieve the Tripiṭaka. On the way, Hoin saves a man named Bbareun-gaebi, who has been trapped under a cliff for a thousand years. Bbareun-gaebi carries the monk on his back and jumps into the underwater realm of the Dragon King. The two board a ship from there to Sukhavati. Hoin receives the Tripiṭaka from the Jade Emperor and gives the scriptures to Taizong.

Taizong calls forth Maeil and Jangsang and praises them, speaking of his experiences in the afterlife. He offers them great fortunes to pay back the money he borrowed from their afterlife vaults, but they refuse, instead regretting that they have not helped as many people as they could. The emperor insists, saying that it is the order of the King of the Dead that they accept payment. Afterwards, the emperor consults with Maeil and Jangsang on every affair and does good works for humanity.

=== Jo Sul-saeng's version ===
Jo Sul-saeng (1906–1997)'s version was recited in 1961 and published by the Korean ethnographer Jin Seong-gi in 1991. It is extremely short compared to Bak's, and lacks narrative coherence. As Jo was then only a novice shaman, (Note: Jo inherited the mengdu of her husband when he immigrated to Japan, and was not a shaman from a young age.) there is scholarly doubt as to the quality of the narratives she recited.

Maeil is a man from heaven and Jangsam is an earthly woman. When there is a famine in heaven, the two decide to make a living on earth. They do hired work on sunny days but refuse to take all of their wages, and make shoes on rainy days but sell at low prices. When they die, they find that their vaults in the afterlife are full of the money that they did not take.

The greedy Emperor Taizong dies and goes to the afterlife, only to find that all there is for him is a single bundle of straw that he had given while alive to a woman with a newborn. The emperor borrows money from Maeil and Jangsam's vaults to repay the people he stole from before he is allowed to return to the living world. The emperor is resurrected after four days and repays his debts by holding a ritual for the souls of the couple. Later, Maeil and Jangsam build a bridge called the Deokjin Bridge in Yeongam in mainland Korea. They receive charity from everyone crossing the bridge and use these donations to create a bridge to the world of the dead.

== Ritual context ==
The Semin-hwangje bon-puri was formerly recited in the Chaseyeong-maji, a component ritual of the Siwang-maji, the funeral ceremony of Jeju shamanism. (Note: The Siwang-maji is itself the sixteenth component ritual of the Great Gut, the largest sequence of ceremonies in Jeju shamanism.) The Chasayeong-maji consists of the shaman ritually paving a road for the gods of death to arrive, and reenacting the journey of the soul to the afterlife on this road. At the end of the Chasayeong-maji, the shaman opens the twelve doors of the afterlife for the soul to pass. The Semin-hwangje bon-puri was recited at this part, as a rite in which the deceased soul repents its sins in this world—much as the emperor does in the myth—before exiting it. The central purposes of the narrative were to remind the worshippers that good works and charity are religiously important and will be rewarded in due time, and also to demonstrate the efficacy of shamanic ritual, here construed as a form of charity, in helping the deceased be forgiven of their sins. It is accordingly characterized as a highly moralistic myth.

The narrative has not been attested in any fieldwork of Jeju shamanism since 1961 and is not recited today, although a disciple of Jo Sul-saeng was aware of its existence when interviewed in 2002. As traditional Jeju religion has been in decline since the 1960s, relatively unimportant narratives such as the Semin-hwangje bon-puri may have been abandoned by shamans.

== Tale of Tang Taizong and other literature ==
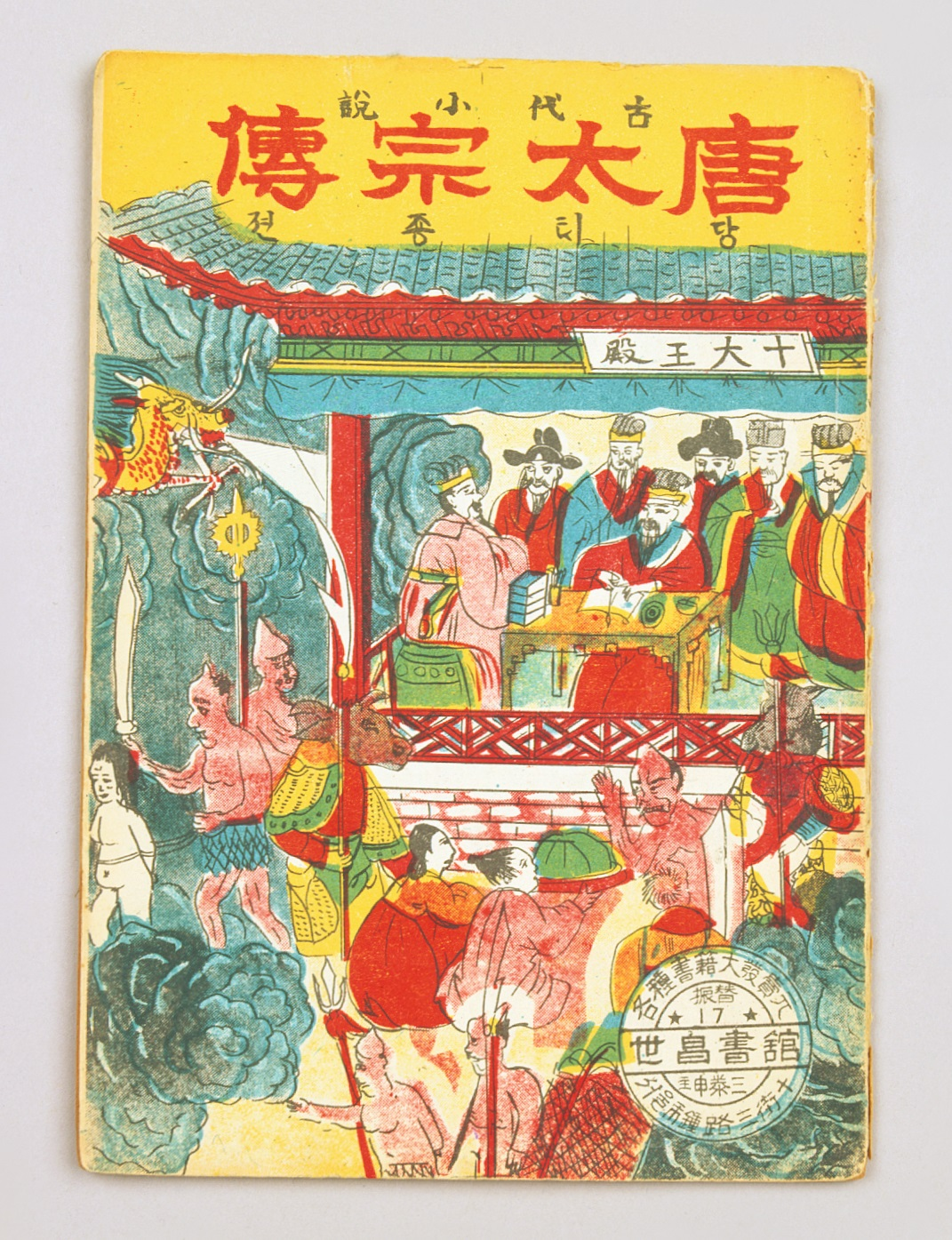
Mid-twentieth-century copy of the Tale of Tang Taizong

There is scholarly consensus that the Semin-hwangje bon-puri is a shamanic adaptation of the Tale of Tang Taizong (Korean 당태종전/唐太宗傳 Dang Taejong Jeon), a Korean-language Buddhist novel of unclear date which was itself inspired by the tenth to twelfth chapters of the sixteenth-century Chinese novel Journey to the West, in which Emperor Taizong dies but is granted twenty more years of life by the gods of the afterlife. Indeed, the overall narrative of the Bak Bong-chun version is effectively identical to that of the novel. The fact that Jo's 1960s version diverges much more from the Buddhist original than Bak's 1930s version may reflect diachronic changes as the narrative increasingly shed its Buddhist origins before ultimately being lost.

In both versions, the shamanic narrative has excised large parts of the original novel that were irrelevant to its religious purpose of exhorting charity. The Buddhist story begins with a detailed series of intrigues between men and gods which culminate in the emperor's untimely death at the hands of the Dragon King. There is no moral judgement made about Taizong's death. These sections were removed entirely in the moralistic shamanic narrative. Instead, the emperor dies after tormenting his fellow humans.

The character of Taizong was revised to suit the new context. The novel highlights the fact that Taizong is the emperor of China, and that even a man as powerful as he comes to accept the importance of charity and patronize Buddhism. Yet the shamanic narrative consistently deemphasizes the emperor's political position and instead simply posits him as an individual who comes to repent sin and embrace righteousness. In the original, the emperor is harassed by the spirits of soldiers who had died in his wasteful military campaigns; in the shamanic myth, he is threatened by the spirits of people whose property he had unjustly taken. The Buddhist Ten Kings of Hell treat the emperor with great courtesy as the Son of Heaven, but the shamanic King of the Dead berates him for his greed and sins.

Perhaps the most significant change in the shamanic adaptation—connected to the deemphasis of the emperor—is the greatly expanded role of Jangsang. In the original text, Jangsang (Note: Jangsang himself is an adaptation of a Journey to the West character named Xiang Liang, who plays the same role of unwittingly lending Taizong money from his afterlife vaults in order to allow the emperor to compensate the dead he caused to suffer.) is merely portrayed as a man with a rich afterlife vault who Taizong borrows from, and who the emperor lavishly rewards after his resurrection with gifts that overawe the man. Yet not only does the shamanic narrative insert a new character, Maeil, as Jangsang's spouse, the emperor and thus the audience directly witness the good works that the couple do. Rather than being awed by Taizong's gifts, the couple regret that they have not helped as many people as they could, and Bak's version concludes with them mentoring the emperor in the doing of good works. In Jo's version, Maeil and Jangsam are outright the dominant figures of the narrative, with Taizong himself appearing only in the middle of their story. Her version concludes with the couple building a bridge to teach the entire world to do charity, not just the emperor as in the older account. The greater prominence of Jangsang, the exemplary charitable figure of the narrative, enhances the shamanic narrative's religious purpose.

Both Jangsang and Maeil also appear in the Woncheon'gang bon-puri shamanic narrative, in which they are a boy and a girl reading books who guide the girl Oneul on her way to her divine parents. At the end of the myth, Oneul's parents arrange a marriage between the two, promising them "ten thousand years of splendor." The presence of Maeil as Jangsang's spouse in the Semin-hwangje bon-puri reflects influence from this preexisting myth, while the name "Jangsang" in the Woncheon'gang bon-puri may be a product of later influence from the Tale of Tang Taizong.

Folklorist Shin Dong-hun suggests that Bak's version may be understood in the light of the Cheonji-wang bon-puri, the Jeju creation myth. The Cheonji-wang bon-puri concludes with the benevolent brother Daebyeol-wang becoming the king of the dead and establishing justice there, while the younger, malevolent Sobyeol-wang takes charge of the living. Noting that the god of the Semin-hwangje bon-puri is referred to as the "King of the Dead" rather than as Yama, the more conventional designation of the chief death god in Jeju shamanism, Shin speculates that the King of the Dead is Daebyeol-wang himself and that Taizong stands for the injustice and suffering of the human world previously personified by Sobyeol-wang. This notion is further supported by the narrative's characterization of the King of the Dead, which aligns with the benevolent personality of Daebyeol-wang better than the cold-heartedness characteristic of Yama:

And so, when the King of Death thought upon the myriad things and were astounded by them... He called forth Emperor Semin and spoke in a sad-sounding voice, "You nasty rascal... The virtue of living humans is to feed the hungry and to clothe the naked, and to give to the poor. You must thus do good works for all humanity... Now go swiftly out to the living world, do good works for all humanity, and then return."

Bak's version includes Hoin's quest for the Buddhist canon found in the original source, which is itself an abbreviated account of Xuanzang's voyage to the Western Regions that makes up most of the Journey to the West. Even the monkey king Sun Wukong makes an appearance in the guise of Bbareun-gaebi. But whereas Hoin journeys to India in the original, as was historically the case, the shamanic narrative involves him ascending into the world of the gods. According to Shin, the Buddhist law represents the clear and just law of Daebyeol-wang's realm, explaining why the monk's destination had to be revised to a divine location rather than the physical country of India.

The final episode in Jo's version—that of the Deokjin Bridge—does not exist in the Buddhist original but is found in Yeongam itself in the form of a well-known folktale without religious significance. In this story, the county magistrate of Yeongam dies and can only return to life after borrowing money from the afterlife vaults of the virtuous Deokjin to compensate those he made suffer. The resurrected magistrate visits the latter to repay his debts, but he refuses to accept the money. The magistrate instead builds a bridge with the money and names it after Deokjin. The bridge also appears in the village-shrine bon-puri of Jeju Island as a bridge that people cross on their way from the mainland to Jeju. The narrative's direct reference to Yeongam suggests influence from the folktale.
