= Igong Maji =

Korean shamanic ritual

The Igong Maji (Korean: 이공맞이; lit. 'Greeting the Igong' is a Korean shamanistic ritual done in Jeju Island. Because Igong, the god of flowers, does not have an important role in common life, the Igong Maji was done only as a part of a large gut ritual.

== Causes ==
Igong was the patron of the Fields of Seocheon, a mythological realm of magical flowers. The myth concerning the Igong (Hallakgungi being his true name, and Igong being only a title) is called the Igong Bonpuli.

According to the Igong Bonpuli, the Fields of Seocheon include many magical flowers, but only two have importance; the Hwansaengkkot (literally Flowers of reincarnation) and the Suremyeolmangaksimkkot (literally Flower that brings destruction through the evil mind). The Hwansaengkkot include the Bbyeoalikkot (flower that revives the bones), Salsalikkot (flower that revives the flesh), Ojangyukbusalikkot (flower that revives the intestines), Pisalikkot (flower that revives the blood), Sumsalikkot (flower that revives the breath), and Honsalikkot (flower that revives the soul).

Thus, the Igong Maji ritual was intended to ward off destruction and evil caused by the Suremyeolmangakshimkkot and gather the prosperity caused by the Hwansaengkkot.

Additionally, the Igong Maji had another function. Because it was believed that the children who died under the age of fifteen would assist in raising the magical flowers, parents who lost their children prayed to Igong to not harass their children.

== Supplies ==
The Igong Maji was done in the hall of the house. In the hall was a large table, filled with sacrifices for the Igong. The sacrifices included rice, sirutteok, fish, fruits, vegetables, eggs, wine, and a Jeju Island cuisine called dollaetteok. The essential ingredients of the Igong Maji were the Suremyeolmangaksimkkot and the Hwansaengkkot. A bundle of intertwined ropes symbolized the Suremyeolmangaksimkkot, and camellia flowers placed in a bowl of rice symbolized the Hwansaengkkot.

== Parts ==
The Igong Maji was divided into seven parts.

1. Chogamje, an introduction. It starts from the creation of the world. Next, the shaman gives a geographical and historical explanation of the location (this is called the Bepodoeobchim), then the shaman describes the date and location of the ritual (this is called the Gukseomgim). Next, the shaman gives the reason for the ritual (this is called the Jiban Yeonyu Dakkeum). The Gunmun Yeollim follows. The Gunmun Yeollim opens the way for Igong. Next, the Saedorim cleans the way for Igong, the Shincheonggwe checks if the way is open or not, and the Bunbusaroem checks if the god came or not.
2. Chumul Gongyeon, a song urging the Igong to eat the sacrifice.
3. Igong Jilchim, an integral part of the Igong Maji. The shaman says that the way that Igong walks through is a steep, dirty road, and cleans the road. The shaman cuts plants with a sacred sword, sweeps the dead plants with a stick, digs up the roots of the plants, stomps on the humps of the trail, sweeps away the stones, smoothens the trail, waters the trail to dispose of the dust, covers mud with a belt, and releases butterflies into the air. Finally, the shaman covers the trails with a long piece of linen, slices up the linen, and sprinkles rice and powder on the linen.
4. Soji Sareum, a ritual where people pray to the Igong.
5. Igongi Jeonsanggut, a curious ritual. The shaman makes tteok and wine, then suddenly pretends to be ill. He signifies that his head is ill by putting a tteok on his head, and also puts a tteok on his ears, nose, chin, shoulder, hip, belly, legs, and feet. Then, the shaman uses the power of Igong to expel the sickness from the body.
6. Seoksalim, a ritual to rest the Igong.
