= Igong bon-puri =

Korean shamanic myth from Jeju Island

- Hangul: 이공본풀이
- Hanja: 二公本풀이
- Revised Romanization: Igong bonpuri
- McCune–Reischauer: Igong ponp'uri

The Igong Bonpuri (Korean: 이공 본풀이), better known in Korea as the Hallakgungi myth (Korean: 할락궁이 신화) is a narrative traditionally told by shamans on the Korean island of Jejudo. The story bears similarity to the Buddhist book Worin Seokbo (月印釋譜; "The Moon's Reflection on the Buddha's Genealogy"), showing the close relationship of Korean mythology and Buddhist mythology.

== Plot ==
The Igong Bonpuli tells the story of Hallakgungi, who became the deity who protected the mythological realm of the Fields of Seocheon (서천 꽃밭, literally flower fields of the West). The story is traditionally split into four parts; the parts will not be mentioned here.

Long ago lived Gimjeongguk of the nation of Gimjeong, who lived in the upper village, and Imjeongguk of Imjeong, who lived in the lower village. Gimjeongguk was very poor, but Imjeongguk was extremely rich. However, both had no children, even after the age of forty; thus, they both prayed to a temple on the eastern peaks. Soon, the wives of both Gimjeongguk and Injeongguk both delivered infants. Gimjeongguk's child was a boy named Sara Doryeong, and Imjeongguk's child was a girl named Wongang Ami. The parents of Sara Doryeong and Wongang Ami promised that their children would marry each other in the future.

When both children matured, Sara Doryeong and Wongang Ami married each other, and Wongang Ami soon bore a child. But one day, Sara Doryeong dreamed that the supreme deity, Okhwang Sangje, was summoning him to be the Igong (also known as Kkotgamdok, literally 'administrator of flowers'), the guardian of the Fields of Seocheon. Wongang Ami dreamed the same dream. However, because Wongang Ami was expecting a child, they refused to go. Still, Sara Doryeong and Wongang Ami was forced to go west to the Fields of Seocheon once they had the same dream for three nights.

As they went on their way, Wongang Ami found that it was nearly impossible to continue the harsh journey because of her pregnancy. Finally, she pleaded with Sara Doryeong to sell herself and her unborn child as a slave. Sara Doryeong accepted the plea, and tried to sell Wongang Ami for 300 coins and the fetus for 100 coins to a wealthy man named Cheonnyeon Jangja.

Cheonnyeon Jangja's first and second daughters advised their father to refuse to buy Wongang Ami, but the third daughter said that they should buy Wongang Ami. Cheonnyeon Jangja heeded the third daughter's advice and bought Wongang Ami.

Sara Doryeong broke his comb in half, and gave one half to Wongang Ami, advising her to give this to her child when he/she tried to find his/her father. Sara Doryeong left, telling Wongang Ami to name the child Hallakgungi if he was male and Hallakdegi if she was female.

After Sara Doryeong left, Cheonnyeon Jangja attempted to force Wongang Ami into having sexual intercourse with him, but Wongang Ami excused herself by saying that in her country, people remarried only when a child was born.

Soon, Wongang Ami delivered a boy. Heeding her husband's advice, she named the boy Hallakgungi. That night, Cheonnyeon Jangja appeared again, trying to force Wongang Ami into sexual union again, as the child was born. Wongang Ami once again refused, saying that in her country, people remarried only when the child plowed the fields with a plow and a cattle.

Cheonnyeon Jangja was enraged by the constant refusals, and attempted to kill Wongang Ami. However, the third daughter advised him that they should use Wongang Ami and Hallakgungi as laborers. Again, Cheonnyeon Jangja heeded the third daughter's advise, and forced Wongang Ami to carry five bowls of water every day and build three bowls for holding water every night. When Hallakgungi passed from infant to child, Cheonnyeon Jangja forced Hallakgungi to log fifty trees per day and twist fifty knots per night.

One day, Cheonnyeon Jangja ordered Hallakgungi to clear all the trees on an entire mountainside within a day, and to seed the field with millet. When Hallakgungi reached the mountain, a gigantic wild boar appeared and plowed down all the trees. Hallakgungi then seeded the fields and returned to Cheonnyeon Jangja's mansion.

Cheonnyeon Jangja was surprised by the extremely fast fulfillment of his orders, but then gave a new task to Hallakgungi. He said that the millet seeds had been planted at the wrong time, and ordered Hallakgungi to retrieve all the seeds. When Hallakgungi returned to the field, a colony of Carpenter ants had already stacked the millet seeds in a careful pile. When Halakgungi returned with the pile of millet seeds, Cheonnyeon Jangja counted them cautiously, and pronounced that one seed was missing. When Hallakgungi stepped out of Cheonnyeon Jangja's mansion, a single carpenter ant was waiting for him out the gate. The ant was biting on a single millet seed with its jaws. Hallakgungi took the millet seed and gave it to Cheonnyeon Jangja.

When Hallakgungi was ten, Cheonnyeon Jangja ordered Hallakgungi to plow the fields with a plow and a cattle. Cheonnyeon Jangja then approached Wongang Ami, and tried to force her once again to have sexual intercourse with him, as Hallakgungi now plowed the fields. Wongang Ami made up another excuse, but her options were narrowing.

One day, Hallakgungi met old men playing Baduk in the woods where he went to log. They told Hallakgungi to catch a white stag and ride on the stag to his father. As he climbed down the mountain, he found a white stag grazing on a ridge. Hallakgungi captured the stag and took him to Cheonnyeon Jangja's mansion.

After returning to the mansion of his master, Hallakgungi went to find his mother, Wongang Ami. He asked Wongang Ami who his father was. After a brief pause, Wongang Ami answered that the father of Hallakgungi was Cheonnyeon Jangja. In response, Hallakgungi asked Wongang Ami to fry red beans for him. However, Wongang Ami could not find a spoon. As she was stirring the frying beans with her own hand, Hallakgungi crushed Wongang Ami's hand so that she could not raise her hand above the frying beans. He then asked once again who his father was. Wongang Ami took the broken comb and gave it to her son, and told Hallakgungi that his father was Sara Doryeong, who was now the deity Igong, the guardian of the Fields of Seocheon. Additionally, she made Hallakgungi two Tteok, or rice cake, by mixing five sacks of buckwheat and five sacks of salt. Hallakgungi rode on the white stag and fled Cheonnyeon Jangja's mansion.

Cheonnyeon Jangja was enraged by Hallakgungi's escape and set his two bloodhounds, Cheollidongi and Mallidongi, on Hallakgungi's trail. Cheollidongi could run 1,000 li, or 500 kilometers, per day (about 50 km/h), and Mallidongi could run 10,000 li, or 5,000 kilometers, per day (about 500 km/h).

Cheollidongi was the first to find Hallakgungi on the white stag. Hallakgungi threw the dog one of his two buckwheat cakes. Cheollidongi ate the cake, but found that the cake was extremely salty. Cheollidongi fled to get a drink of water. Likewise, when Mallidongi came to attack Hallakgungi, Hallakgungi also gave him a cake, and the bloodhound fled to get a drink of water.

Meanwhile, Cheonnyeon Jangja tortured Wongang Ami three times, but Wongang Ami did not submit to Cheonnyeon Jangja's wishes. Finally, Cheonnyeon Jangja cut off Wongang Ami's head, legs and arms, and fed her remains to the crows in the Field of Cheongdae.

Hallakgungi was continuing the way to the Fields of Seocheon when he encountered a white river as high as the knee. Next, he encountered a yellow river as high as the waist, and finally, he encountered a red river as high as the neck.

When Hallakgungi crossed the red river, he found himself in a strange land. The land was the Fields of Seocheon. When he heard someone approaching, Hallakgungi quickly hid himself on a willow tree near a lake and mixed a drop of blood by into the lake biting his midfinger. When the young apprentices of the Fields of Seocheon scooped up the water in the lake and give them to the flowers in the Fields of Seocheon, the flowers shriveled up. When Sara Doryeong was informed of this mysterious plague, he went to the willow tree and asked Hallakgungi who he was. Hallakgungi answered that he was Hallakgungi, son of Wongang Ami, and gave the broken comb to Sara Doryeong. Sara Doryeong also took out his half of the broken comb, and matched the two halves. The match was perfect.

Sara Doryeong said that the three multicolored rivers were composed of the tears of Wongang Ami during her three tortures. Hallakgungi vowed to take revenge on Cheonnyeon Jangja. In response, Sara Doryeong gave Hallakgungi the five Hwansaengkkot (literally 'Flowers of Reincarnation'), which were the Bbyeosalikkot (literally 'Flower that revives the bones'), Salsalikkot (literally 'Flower that revives the flesh'), Pisalikkot (literally 'Flower that revives the blood'), Sumsalikkot (literally 'Flower that revives the breath'), and Honsalikkot (literally 'Flower that revives the soul'). Additionally, Sara Doryeong gave Hallakgungi the Uleumkkot (Flower of weeping), Useumkkot (Flower of laughter), Bulbuteulkkot (Flower that brings fire'), Bujadoelkkot ('Flower that brings affluence') Ssaumkkot (Flower of combat), Seonshimkkot (Flower of the good mind), and the Suremyeolmangakshimkkot (Flower that brings destruction through the evil mind). Finally, Sara Doryeong made his son a cane made out of styrax wood.

Hallakgungi returned to Cheonnyeon Jangja's house, disguised as a blind magician. He first showed the Useumkkot, which was created to give joy to those in despair. Suddenly, Cheonnyeon Jangja's family laughed ceaselessly to the point of being painful. Next was the Uleumkkot, designed to grant tears to those who had no tears. Every member of Cheonnyeon Jangja's family found themselves weeping for no reason. Then, Hallakgungi showed the Ssaumkkot, and Cheonnyeon Jangja's family fought viciously among themselves.

Hallakgungi told the third daughter of Cheonnyeon Jangja to cover her eyes, then finally revealed the Suremyeolmangakshimkkot. Everyone except the third daughter ate each other until the only survivors were Hallakgungi and the third daughter. Hallakgungi asked the third daughter where Wongang Ami's body was, and the third daughter had no choice but to answer.

When Hallakgungi reached the Field of Cheongdae, he found that a rose of winter tree had grown on Wongang Ami's forehead and that an empress tree had grown on Wongang Ami's chest. When he placed the Bbyeosalikkot, the scattered bones met with each other to form a complete skeleton. When he placed the Salsalikkot, flesh grew above the bones. When he placed the Pisalikkot, blood flew in Wongang Ami's veins. When he placed the Sumsalikkot, Wongang Ami started to breathe again. When Hallakgungi placed the Honsalikkot, Wongang Ami regained consciousness. Finally, Hallakgungi struck Wongang Ami three times with his styrax cane. Wongang Ami finally rose.

After seeing that a rose of winter and an empress tree had grown on her body, Wongang Ami said that these trees had grown on her fury. Thus, from that day, women made hair oil from rose of winter fruit and make a cane from empress tree wood.

Wongang Ami and Hallakgungi went to the fields of Seocheon together. There, Hallakgungi became the second Igong, the god of the fields of Seocheon. Meanwhile, Sara Doryeong and Wongang Ami retreated somewhere in the heavens.

News of the tale of Hallakgungi was spread by those who had lived near Cheonnyeon Jangja. From that day, it became traditionary for sons to carry on their father's career, just as Hallakgungi had carried on Sara Doryeong's career of Igong.

== Igong Maji ==
Like nearly all Korean oral myths, the Igong Bonpuli is part of a Gut, or shamanistic ritual.

The Igong Bonpuli is sung in most large Guts in Jeju Island, a medium-sized island south of the Korean Peninsula. In large Guts, the Igong Bonpuli is sung after the Chogong Maji.

The recital of the Igong Bonpuli is a part of the larger ritual, Igong Maji, literally 'Greeting the Igong'.

The Igong Maji was recited by a shaman in peasant's clothing. He sat on a table and sang the myth with the help of a drum-like instrument called the Janggu.

== Field of Seocheon in other myths ==
The Field of Seocheon is a highly important setting in Korean mythology, but especially in Jeju Island. It appears in four myths, excluding the Igong Bonpuli.

- In the myth of Baridegi, the seventh daughter of King Ogu, uses the five Hwansaengkkot to revive her dead father.
- In the Munjeon Bonpuli myth, Nokdisaengin, the seventh son of Namseonbi, revives his dead mother with the Hwansaengkkot. He is aided by Hallakgungi.
- In the Segyeong Bonpuli myth, Jacheong-bi borrows the Hwansaengkkot from Sara Doryeong (called 'Great King Sara' or 'Sara Jangja' in the Segyeong Bonpuli) in return for killing an owl. Jacheong Bi uses the five flowers to revive Jeongsunam, her slave. In the Segyeong Bonpuli, Sara Doryeong has three daughters.

Towards the end of the Segyeong Bonpuli, Jacheong-bi borrows the Suremyeolmangakshimkkot from Sara Doryeong. Jacheong-bi uses the Suremyeolmangakshimkkot to destroy an army of Gwishin, who have rebelled against the gods.

- In the Saelbung Halmang Bonpuli and the Manura Bonpuli, the goddess of childbirth, Samshin, is said to use the Hwansaengkkot to impregnate a woman.

== Similarities with other myths ==
The Igong Bonpuli bears a striking similarity to the eighth chapter of the Buddhist book Wolin Seokbo. The Wolin Seokbo was written in 15th-century Korea, and it is perfectly possible that the myth of the Igong Bonpuli influenced the Wolin Seokbo, or vice versa.

The eighth chapter of the Wolin Seokbo is a piece of Buddhist mythology about the Crown Prince Anrakguk. In the Wolin Seokbo myth, Hallakgungi is called 'Anrakguk', Sara Doryeong is 'Great King Sarasu', Wongang Ami is 'Wonang Buin', and Cheonnyeon Jangja is called 'Jahyeon Jangja'. The plot is also similar; Anrakguk revives his mother Wonang Buin, who was murdered when Jahyeon Jangja stabbed her with a sword, with lotus flowers given by his father Great King Sarasu. However, in the Anrakguk myth, there is no realm resembling the Fields of Seocheon.

There are two Korean oral myths in the mainland that resemble the Igong Bonpuli. First is a myth in the Ganggye region of North Korea, which is called the Sinseon Setyeonnim Cheongbae. Another is the Yakyangguk Wangja Norae myth, literally 'Song of the Prince of the State of Yakyang', retold in the Gimhae region.
