= Korean creation narratives =

Aspect of Korean mythology

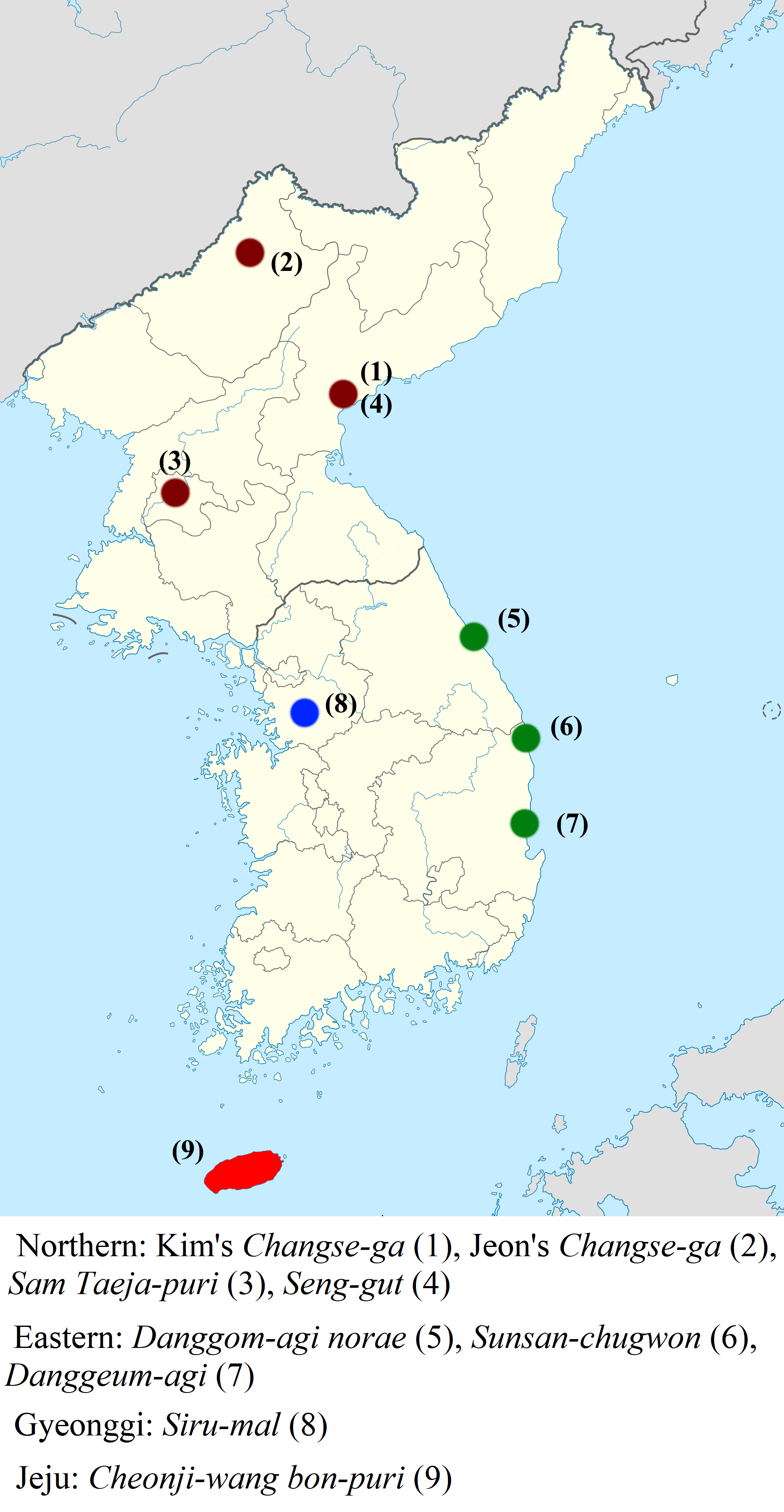
Locations of all known Korean creation narratives

Korean creation narratives are Korean shamanic narratives which recount the mythological beginnings of the universe. They are grouped into two categories: the eight narratives of mainland Korea, which were transcribed by scholars between the 1920s and 1980s, and the Cheonji-wang bon-puri narrative of southern Jeju Island, which exists in multiple versions and continues to be sung in its ritual context today. The mainland narratives are subdivided into four northern and three eastern varieties, plus one from west-central Korea.

Many elements are shared by most Korean creation narratives. In one such episode, two gods grow flowers in a contest to decide who will rule the human world. The deserving, benevolent god grows the (better) blossom, but the other god steals it while the good god sleeps. The undeserving cheater thereby becomes the ruler of humanity and spreads evil into the world. In another pan-Korean episode, there are originally two suns and two moons, making the world unbearably hot during the day and intolerably cold at night, until a deity destroys one of each.

Nonetheless, there are major structural differences between most mainland narratives and the Jeju Cheonji-wang bon-puri. In the former, the world is created by the god Mireuk, who ushers in an ancient age of plenty. Mireuk is then challenged by the god Seokga, and the two gods often engage in contentions of supernatural power, culminating in Seokga's victory through trickery in the flower contest. Mireuk departs, and the era of abundance is replaced by the current world. In Jeju, the celestial deity Cheonji-wang descends to earth after creation and impregnates an earthly woman. She gives birth to the twin boys Daebyeol-wang and Sobyeol-wang, who ascend to heaven, destroy the doubled sun and moon, and engage in the flower contest. The world of the living under the duplicitous Sobyeol-wang's rule is full of evil, but Daebyeol-wang goes to the world of the dead and often establishes justice there.

Many elements of Korean creation myths find parallels in the mythologies of nearby East and Inner Asia societies. The mainland gods Mireuk and Seokga are named after the Buddhist figures of Maitreya and the Buddha, respectively, reflecting influence from a tradition of Maitreya worship. The Korean episode of the flower contest appears with similar themes in many other areas of East and Inner Asia, while stories of superfluous suns and moons have also been attested both north and south of the Korean peninsula.

== Sources and ritual context ==
Korean creation narratives belong to the genre of shamanic narratives, hymns which convey a myth and which are sung by shamans during rituals called gut. In the Korean language, works of the genre often bear the title puri "narration" or bon-puri "origin narration". These myths are traditionally taught line-by-line by accomplished shamans to novices, who are trained over the course of many gut rituals. Korean creation narratives are geographically divided between the eight mainland narratives, transcribed between the 1920s and the 1980s, and twenty known variants of the Cheonji-wang bon-puri, which is still performed in its ritual context on Jeju Island and whose associated rituals are the most archaic. The mainland narratives are subdivided into three groups: four northern, three eastern, and the Siru-mal from west-central Gyeonggi Province. The seven northern and eastern narratives are similar in content, although the eastern ones are more truncated. On the other hand, the story of the Siru-mal is closer to the Cheonji-wang bon-puri.

The basic framework for understanding Korean creation myths—such as the identification of major shared elements between the narratives—was established by Seo Dae-seok of Seoul National University in the first major study of the myths, published in 1980. Kim Heonsun of Kyonggi University made a major contribution in a 1994 monograph that included transcripts of all then-known narratives, including the previously largely unknown Changse-ga hymn of Jeon Myeong-su.

=== Mainland narratives ===
Eight creation narratives have been preserved from mainland Korea. Some are independent narratives. Others survive as elements of the Jeseok bon-puri, a pan-Korean shamanic narrative that celebrates fertility deities.

Northern creation narratives
Title	Title meaning	Reciting shaman	Shaman hometown	Date of recitation	Notes
창세가 Changse-ga	World Creation Song	Kim Ssang-dori	Hamhŭng	1923	Independent creation narrative
창세가 Changse-ga	World Creation Song	Jeon Myeong-su	Kanggye	1931	Independent creation narrative
셍굿 Seng-gut	Sage's Gut	Gang Chun-ok	Hamhŭng	1965	Part of sequence that includes the Jeseok bon-puri
삼태자풀이 Sam Taeja-puri	Narration of the Three Princes	Jeong Un-hak	Pyongyang	1966 (published)	Included in the beginning of the Jeseok bon-puri

The Hamhŭng Changse-ga was transcribed in 1923 by ethnographer Son Jin-tae, based on the recitation of Kim Ssang-dori, a "great shamaness" of Unjŏn-myŏn (modern Hŭngnam) born in 1856. The ritual context is poorly understood. Kim herself recalled that it was a hymn only heard during certain large-scale gut, and that it was not learned by common shamans and that she had been specially trained to perform it. It is the oldest recorded creation narrative. The Kanggye Changse-ga was also transcribed by Son Jin-tae in approximately 1931, with the male shaman Jeon Myeong-su as source. Kim Heonsun calls the two Changse-ga hymns "representative of the northern creation narratives".

The Seng-gut is known from a 1965 recitation by the female shaman Gang Chun-ok, who had fled from Hamhŭng to South Korea during the division of Korea. A very long song with Buddhist influences that strings six stories together, beginning with a creation narrative and ending with a Jeseok bon-puri narrative, it was part of an important ceremony that beseeched the gods to grant long life and sons. Both Kim's Changse-ga and the Seng-gut were recited by Hamhŭng shamans, which may explain a number of shared elements not found in the other northern narratives.

The Sam Taeja-puri was performed in 1966 by two shamans, Jeong Un-hak and Im hak-suk, who had fled Pyongyang during the division. It is primarily a Jeseok bon-puri narrative which, however, opens with a lengthy creation narrative.

According to testimony from a North Korean shaman who defected in 2008, gut rituals have not been held in North Korea since the 1970s and the old hymns are no longer known.

Eastern creation narratives
Title	Title meaning	Reciting shaman	Shaman hometown	Date of recitation	Notes
당금아기 Danggeum-agi	Titled after the heroine of the myth	Choi Eum-jeon	Yeongdeok	1971	Included in the middle of the Jeseok bon-puri
순산축원 Sunsan-chugwon	Prayer for Safe Delivery	Gwon Sun-nyeo	Uljin	1975	Included in the beginning of the Jeseok bon-puri
당고마기 노래 Danggom-agi norae	Song of Danggom-agi	Bak Yong-nyeo	Gangneung	1977 (published)	Included in the beginning of the Jeseok bon-puri

All Eastern narratives are found in truncated form as part of versions of the Jeseok bon-puri. In the Danggom-agi norae, the creation narrative has been so truncated that only one relevant element survives: a flower-growing contest between two creator gods. The purpose of the narrative is also lost. Rather than explain the reason there is evil in the world, as the flower story does in most other accounts, the episode concludes with the cheating god being taught how to spread the Buddhist faith in Korea. The Jeseok bon-puri continues to be performed throughout Korea, but none of the several dozen versions transcribed since 1980 have any creation-related elements.

Siru-mal
Title	Title meaning	Reciting shaman	Shaman hometown	Date of recitation	Notes
시루말 Siru-mal	Steamer Speech	Yi Jong-man	Osan	1937 (published)	Independent creation narrative
시루말 Siru-mal	Steamer Speech	Yi Yong-u	Osan	1980, 1981	Truncated compared to Yi Jong-man's narrative

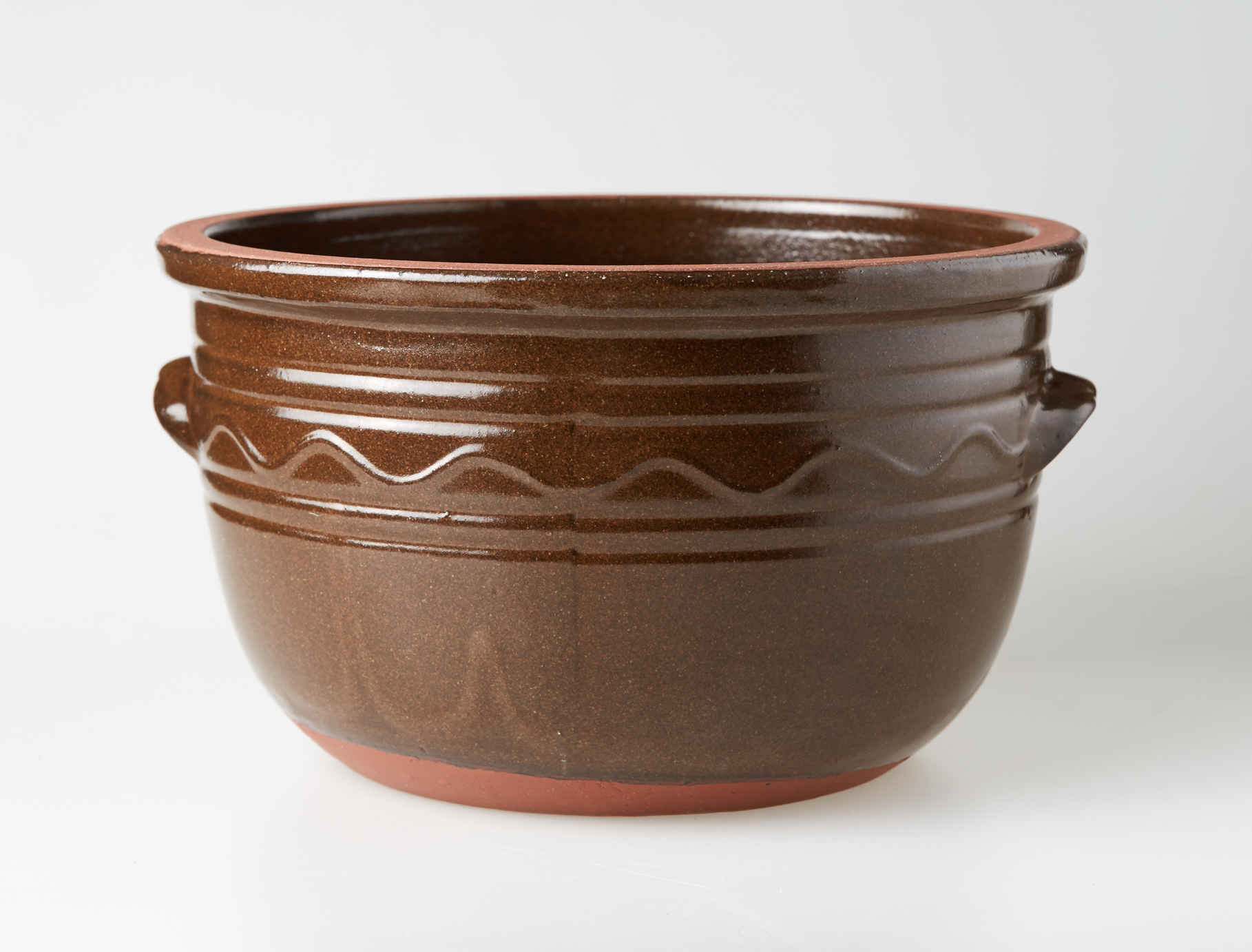
Traditional Korean siru steamer

The Siru-mal was traditionally passed down by hereditary shamans in southern Gyeonggi Province, and its ritual context is better understood. The Siru-mal was an important part of the Dodang-gut, a series of village rituals intended to ensure the community's prosperity. In the 1930s, it was sung as the second phase of the Dodang-gut, held immediately after the shaman had ritually cleansed the ceremonial grounds. The narrative was accompanied by the shaman's offering of rice cakes to the arriving gods, presented in an earthenware food steamer (Korean: 시루 siru) with seven holes. Just before the recitation, this vessel was also used to confirm that the gods had indeed descended and were present. The ceremonies involving the food steamer, including the Siru-mal recitation, thus formally initiated the Dodang-gut.

While the rituals were still being continued into the 1980s, by then the only shaman who knew the narrative itself was Yi Yong-u, who died in 1987. The Siru-mal is known both from his recitations in the 1980s and from a much fuller version sung by his uncle Yi Jong-man in the 1930s. Besides being a close relative, Yi Jong-man had mentored his nephew for six years during the latter's training as a shaman, and the two versions thus represent a single narrative source.

=== Jeju Island ===
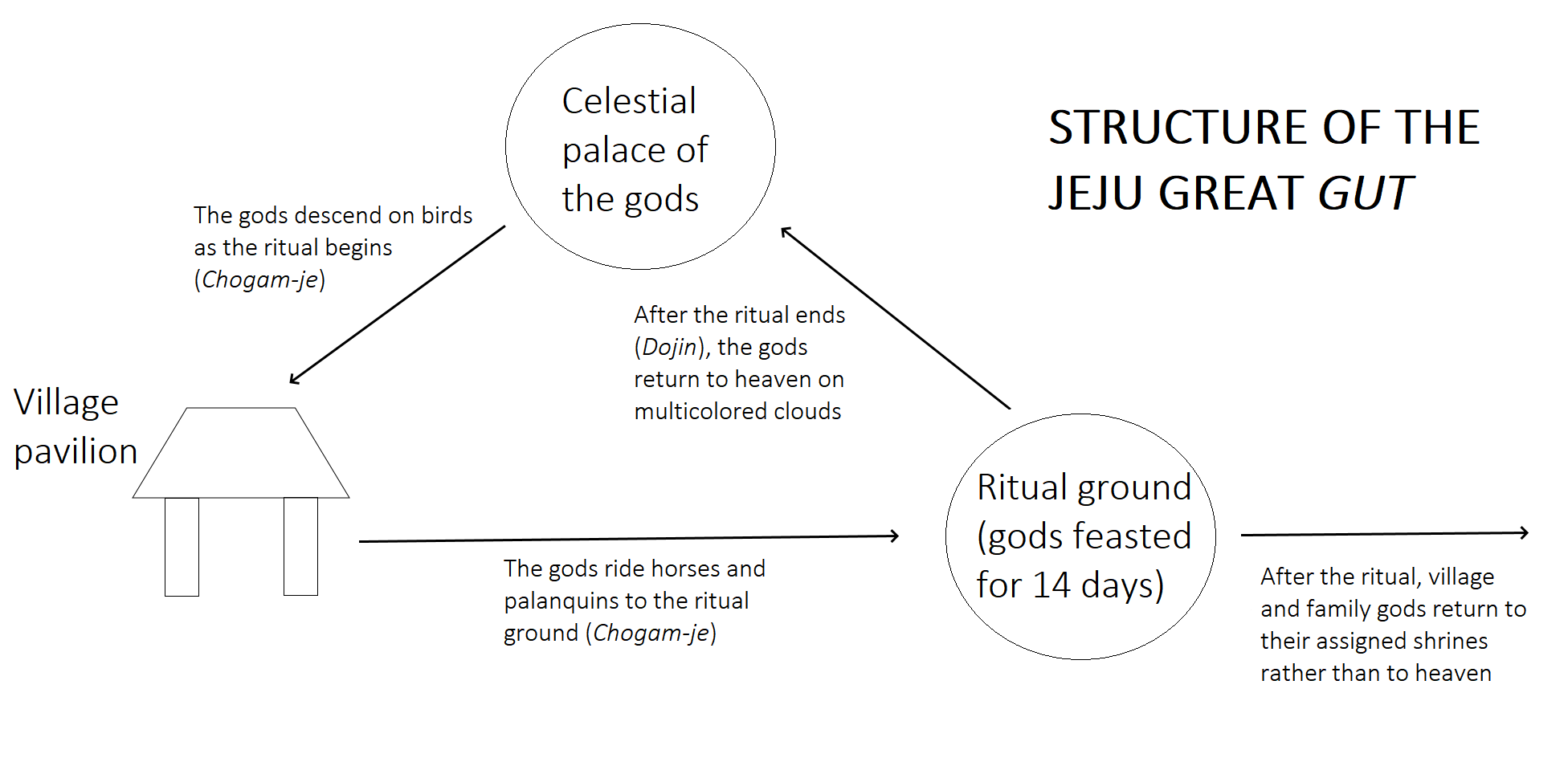
A simple diagram of the Jeju Great Gut. The Chogam-je involves the descent of the gods from their heavenly realm to a sacred pavilion five leagues from the ritual ground and their arrival into the ritual ground itself.

In the shamanism of Jeju Island, the creation narrative is recited in the Great Gut, a large-scale sequence of rituals in which all eighteen thousand gods are venerated, as well as in certain smaller ceremonies dedicated to specific deities. Unlike in mainland Korea, Jeju's creation narrative continues to be performed as sacred ritual. (Note: The narrative was fully recited in the most recent Great Gut, which was in 2011. As mentioned below, a new version was also transcribed in 2017. The Jeju Great Gut, which necessitates knowledge of the Cheonji-wang bon-puri, is currently protected by local government as Intangible Cultural Property.)

The Chogam-je is the first procedure of the Great Gut (Note: Technically, the very first procedure is the Samseok-ullim, in which the sacred drums are beaten three times to forewarn the gods of the ritual. But this is held before even the preparations for the rest of the ritual are made.) by which the shaman invites all eighteen thousand deities to partake in the rituals, from the supreme deity Cheonji-wang to minor spirits such as the shaman's own ancestors. The very first ceremonies of the Chogam-je involve explaining the circumstances of the gut so that the gods may know when, where, and why to come. But before giving the specific details for any particular gut, the shaman begins by retelling the history of the universe in order to give the rituals their full historical and mythological context, a ceremony called the Bepo-doeop-chim.

Before singing the Bepo-doeop-chim narrative, the shaman dances with the sacred knives and bell to the accompaniment of buk drums and suspended and bowl gongs, thus physically reenacting the narrative that is about to follow and also paying respect to the deities of the directions. The creation narrative then opens with the division of a mingled universe into the discrete spheres of heaven and earth and the subsequent creation of mountains, rivers, and other natural entities. Next, the shaman recounts the birth and deeds of the twin deities Daebyeol-wang and Sobyeol-wang. Once this is done, the narrative enters more historical space, lauding the heroes of ancient China from Tianhuang to Laozi and concluding with the recorded history of Korea and Jeju Island.

Versions of the Jeju creation narrative have been titled both Bepo-doeop-chim and Cheonji-wang bon-puri, and the relationship between the two has been disputed. In 2005, for instance, Kim Heonsun claimed that the two were overlapping but separate creation narratives, much as there are two overlapping creation narratives in Genesis. However, practicing Jeju shamans refer to the entire series of chants beginning with the division of the cosmos and ending with the history of Jeju Island as the Bepo-doeop-chim narrative, and consider the Cheonji-wang bon-puri to be the part of this broader narrative that specifically pertains to the twin gods. More recent analyses of Jeju ritual practice also suggest that the Cheonji-wang bon-puri should be considered a component of the Bepo-doeop-chim.

Scholars often refer to the Jeju creation narrative in general, i.e. the part of the Bepo-doeop-chim prior to the discussion of Chinese figures, as the Cheonji-wang bon-puri. This article does likewise.

The Chogam-je itself is held three times in order to ensure that none of the gods have been left behind, meaning that the creation narrative is repeated three times at the beginning of the Great Gut. (Note: Technically, only the first Chogam-je is called Chogam-je; the second is referred to as Chosin-maji and the third as Chosang-gye. There are some differences between the three rituals, as some of the less important component rites are only held the first time.) Even after these first Chogam-je rituals have initiated the entire Great Gut, the Chogam-je must be held again at the beginning of many of the smaller-scale rituals that make up the sequence of rituals, including the important Great Gut rituals honoring the gods of childbirth and death. The creation narrative is thus heard many times in the course of the Great Gut. Besides the Great Gut, the creation narrative is also sung in rituals held for the village gods, as well as at the beginning of the seven following "little gut" or small-scale ceremonies: (Note: These are the ceremonies in which the shaman An Sa-in (1928–1990), who belonged to the highest rank in the priestly hierarchy of Jeju shamanism and remains one of the most important sources on traditional ritual procedure, considered the creation narrative necessary. Currently practicing shamans disagree on what rituals require the narrative.)

- Seongju-puri, a ceremony for the household gods held when moving to a new house
- Chilseong-saenam, a ceremony dedicated to sacred snakes
- Chilseong-je, a ceremony held at night for the star gods
- Buldot-je, a prayer for the health of children
- Pudasi, a healing ceremony for physical ailments
- Durin-gut, a healing ceremony for mental illness
- Buljjik-gut, a ceremony held after a fire to beseech the gods to restore the property

The Cheonji-wang bon-puri narrative also directly explains aspects of the traditional religious life of Jeju Islanders. For example, a major village ritual held on the dinghai day of the first lunisolar month is said to commemorate the anniversary of Daebyeol-wang and Sobyeol-wang's ascent to heaven. The punishment after death of Sumyeong-jangja, an impious man who lends inedible grain and takes high-quality grain as interest in some versions of the Cheonji-wang bon-puri, is cited as the reason a mix of five different grains is offered at funerals.

Many variants of the Jeju creation narrative have been transcribed since the 1930s, including as recently as in 2017. As of that year, twenty different versions of the Cheonji-wang bon-puri were known to researchers. While sharing the overall narrative framework, these versions differ in the details to varying degrees. Some differences may reflect regional variation between the northern and southern halves of Jeju island.

== Shared elements ==
Despite significant variation between and within regions, many elements are shared across Korean creation narratives, such as the following:

- Heaven and earth were originally fused, often being divided by a giant
- Humans and non-humans were indistinct in the early universe
- Two deities engaged in a flower-growing contest to decide who would rule the human world, and the deity who could not grow a good flower won by stealing the other's blossom while he slept
- The current order of the universe formed under this cheating deity, explaining why there is evil on earth
- There were originally two suns and two moons, and one each was destroyed

The flower contest and the destruction of the doubled sun and moon, both of which are found throughout mainland and Jeju corpuses, have received especial scholarly attention.

=== Splitting of heaven and earth ===
Out of the mainland narratives, the initial act of creation is described only in Kim's Changse-ga, which describes the creator god Mireuk splitting heaven and earth:

When heaven and earth came into being, Mireuk was born. Heaven and earth were bound to each other and would not come apart, so he made heaven swell round like a kettle's lid and erected copper pillars on the earth's four corners.

Several other mainland shamanic hymns mention a spontaneous generation of the universe, but their contents are clearly copied from similarly spontaneous creations in Chinese philosophy, sometimes quoting Chinese texts verbatim.

The Jeju hymns agree with the Changse-ga that heaven and earth were originally fused, and characterizes this as a state without gawp, a cosmological concept in Jeju religion that refers to the divide between heaven and earth, humans and non-humans, and the living and the dead. One hymn begins:

Let us speak of the cosmic totality. To speak of the cosmic totality: in the age of the cosmic totality, when the four corners were shrouded in sleep because heaven and earth had no gawp, [I saw that] the universe was a single bundle then. (Note: Translation notes: 1) 천지혼합, a Classical Chinese phrase meaning "mingling of heaven and earth", is here translated "cosmic totality", following Waida 1991, in order to distinguish it from the native expression 하늘과 땅 "heaven and earth", which also appears in the text. 2) In Kim H. 1994, the word ᄌᆞᆷ쑥, translated "shrouded in sleep", is described as ambiguous, meaning both "for the day to be pitch-black" ("날이 컴컴하다") and "to be deep in sleep" ("잠 따위가 깊이 들다"). 3) In Jeju, 옵데다 is an evidential verbal suffix that can only be used for a direct past observation, hence the statement in the brackets. See Jeju language#Sentence enders.)

Four successive processes are said to be involved in the creation of gawp between heaven and earth, although not all versions of the Cheonji-wang bon-puri feature all four:

1. A giant who cleaves the fused universe
2. The division of the universe through the generative energies of heaven, earth, and humanity
3. A cosmic bird (or a rooster) that divides the universe by fluttering its wings and tail
4. The division of the universe through drops of dew

As of 1994, processes (2) and (3) were found in all transcriptions that included the division of heaven and earth.

The cosmic bird—specifically mentioned as a rooster, or multiple roosters, in some versions—is described as contributing to the division of heaven and earth by lifting its head towards the east, then its wings towards the north and south, and finally its tail towards the west. The bird thus faces the direction of the sunrise, like the rooster crowing at the break of dawn. Much as the rooster announces the new day, the cosmic bird's movements announce the coming of the new universe. The Cheonji-wang bon-puri also describes drops of colored dew (이슬 iseul) that fall from heaven and rise from earth, which mingle during the division of the universe; this has been interpreted as symbolizing the mingling of the generative sexual fluids during intercourse. The cosmic dew has also been connected to the use of the word iseul "dew" to refer to vaginal discharge during pregnancy.

It is widely agreed that the generative forces of heaven, earth, and humanity reflect Chinese influence, because the relevant portion of the Cheonji-wang bon-puri often quotes the Chinese philosopher Shao Yong verbatim. Chinese influence has also been suggested for the cosmic giant (see section below) and rooster, but Kim Heonsun argues that both are better seen as indigenous Korean elements.

=== Giant creator ===
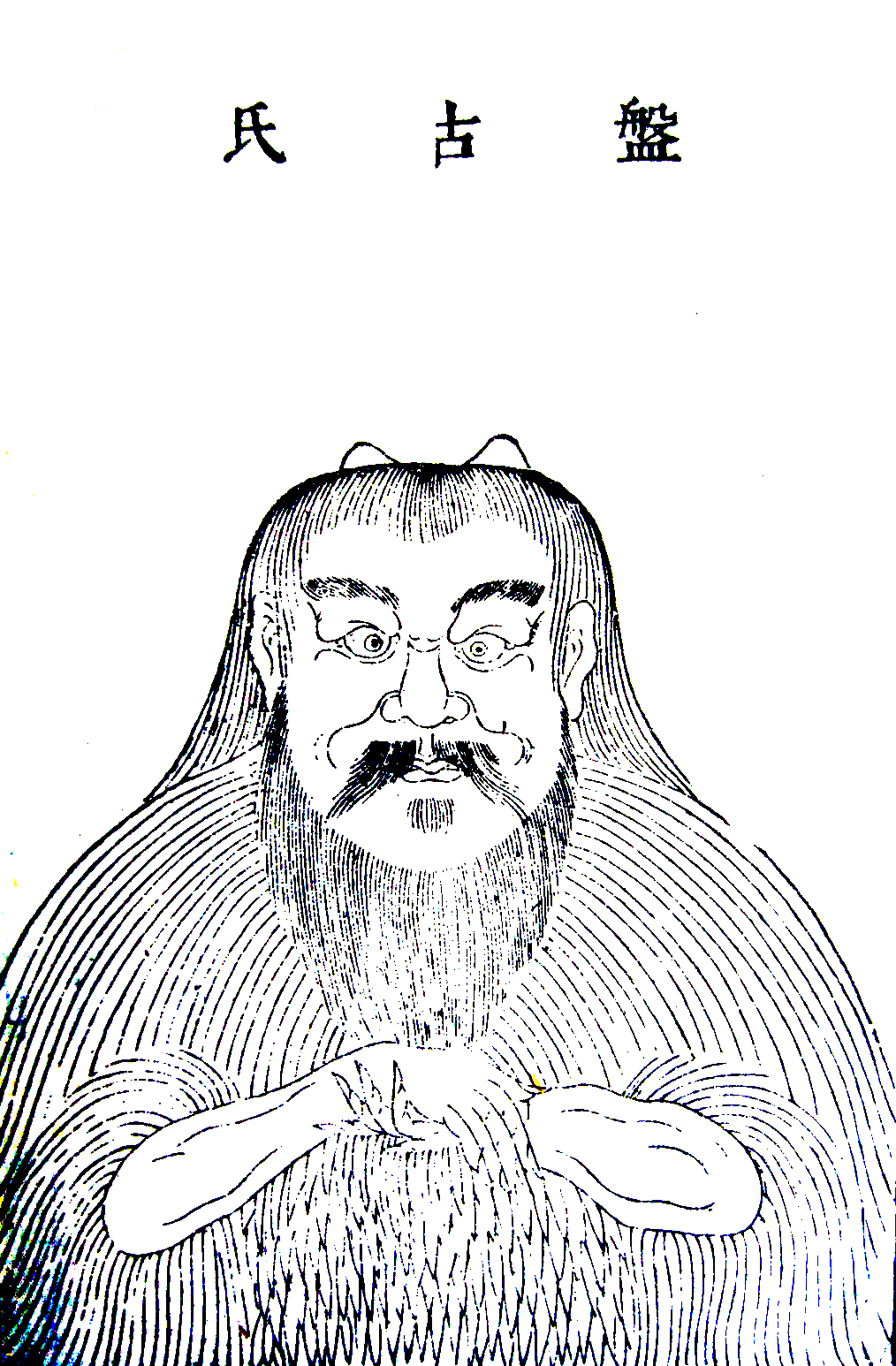
The Chinese giant Pangu, after whom the Korean giant is sometimes named

The involvement of a cosmic giant in creation is another similarity between northern and Jeju narratives. Both Changse-ga hymns depict the gigantic stature of the creator god Mireuk. The sleeves of Mireuk's robe are said to have had the length or width of twenty Chinese feet (roughly 6.7 meters), while the god ate grain by the seom (roughly 180 liters). In one version of the Cheonji-wang bon-puri, a giant "chief gatekeeper" (Jeju: 도수문장 dosumunjang) splits heaven and earth with his bare hands, possibly on the order of the sky god Cheonji-wang. In another version, a giant called Ban'go receives two suns in one hand and two moons in the other and floats them in the sky. This is similar to Mireuk in Kim's Changse-ga, who receives golden insects in one hand and silver insects in the other, and the other giant god Seokga in Jeon's Changse-ga, who also receives two suns and two moons and places them in heaven.

In the Northern narrative the Sam Taeja-puri, Mireuk is portrayed as a cosmic giant whose body forms the sun, moon, and stars after his defeat at the hands of the usurping god Seokga. A similar story is found in many versions of the Cheonji-wang bon-puri, in which the four-eyed giant Cheong'ui-dongja (or Ban'go) appears. The gods' chief gatekeeper plucks out Cheong'ui-dongja's eyes and hurls them into heaven, thus creating the two suns and two moons.

Ban'go, the name of the Korean giant in certain Cheonji-wang bon-puri versions, is the Korean pronunciation of the Chinese creator giant Pangu, suggesting possible influence. But unlike Pangu, whose corpse becomes the universe in Chinese mythology, the Korean giant's body either does not form the world or forms only the celestial objects. The Jeju giant's four eyes is also unattested in Chinese sources, as is the existence of another giant that plucks out the other giant's eyes.

=== Nature of the early universe ===
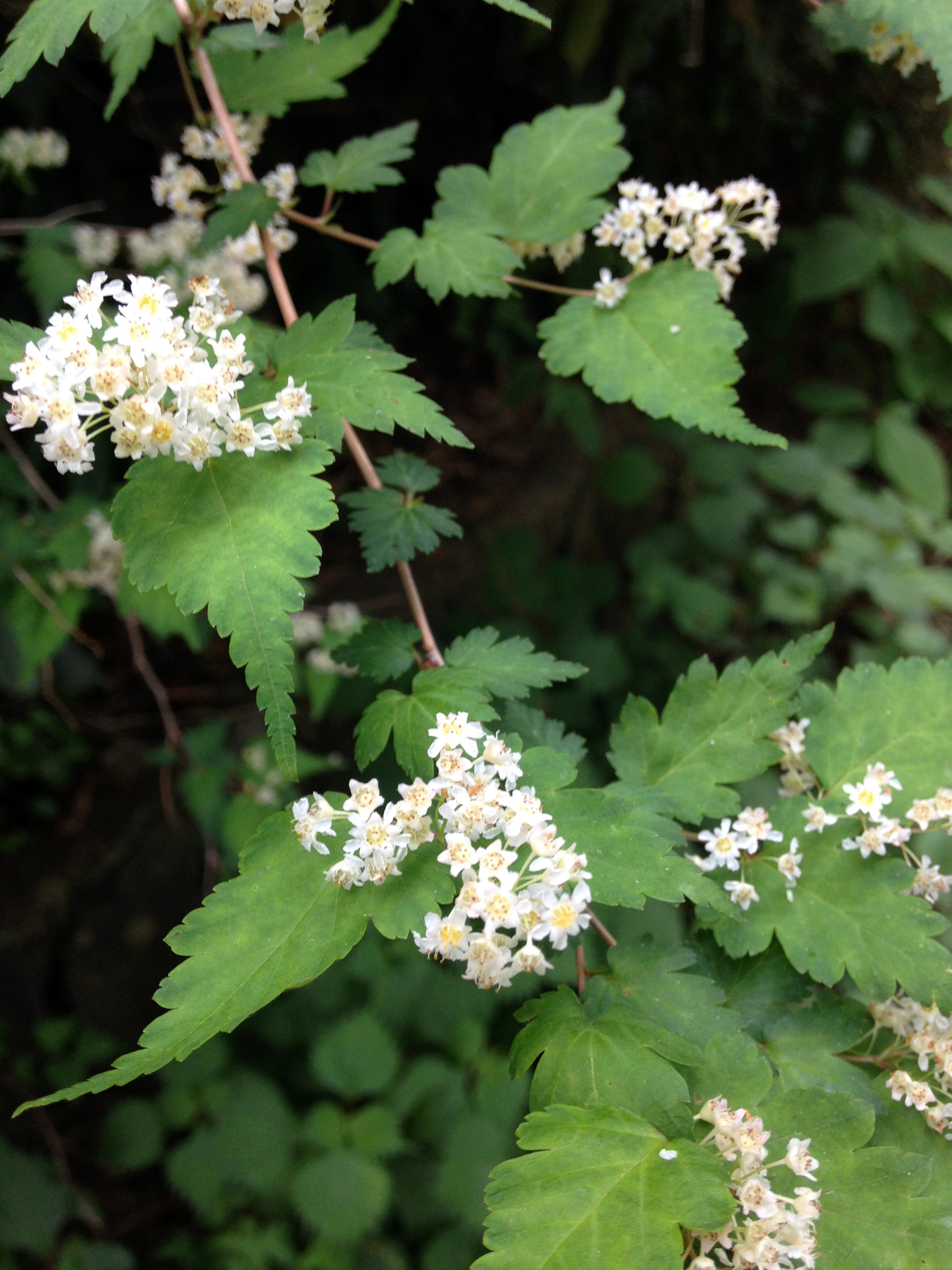
Lace shrubs, on which noodles are said to have grown

Creation narratives from all four regions depict the early universe as having no distinction between the human and non-human domains. For instance, the northern hymns, the Siru-mal, and the Cheonji-wang bon-puri all agree that non-humans were originally able to talk. In Jeju, this era is a chaotic period without gawp during which humanity suffers until the good deity Daebyeol-wang numbs the tongues of "trees and rocks and grasses and crows". But many mainland narratives instead portray an idyllic age ruled by the creator god Mireuk. The Seng-gut implies that humans did not die in Mireuk's age. The Sunsan-chugwon narrative also describes the period rosily, as quoted below:

In the old days and old times, bygone days and bygone times, because people ate from fruits in the trees and did not eat cooked food, at that time, the time of Mireuk, at that time and in that age, there were two suns and two moons. And as clothes grew on cloth trees and cooked rice grew on cooked rice trees, and hazelnuts grew on hazel trees and noodles [국수 guksu] grew on lace shrubs [국수나무 guksu-namu], and rice cakes [떡 tteok] grew on the leaves of oak trees [떡갈나무 tteokgal-namu], and people did not eat cooked food, at that time and in that age, the age of Mireuk, all the children were gentle and no child was diseased. Yes, things were like that, in the age of Mireuk. People ate from fruits in the trees, and there was no agriculture, nor any cooked food.

Park Jong-seong, who analyzes the creator Mireuk as a pastoral or pre-agricultural deity and the usurping Seokga as a god of cultivation, considers the utopian "age of Mireuk" described in the mainland accounts to reflect the ideology of an ancient nomadic group that was antagonistic towards sedentary agriculture.

=== Flower contest and the root of evil ===
Most Cheonji-wang bon-puri versions and all mainland narratives except the Siru-mal feature a contention between two deities. Except in two of the eastern narratives (see section "Connection to the Jeseok bon-puri"), this contention is always about which god will rule the human world. In the mainland, the contending gods are the primeval creator Mireuk and the usurper Seokga. In Jeju, the contenders are the older twin Daebyeol-wang and the younger twin Sobyeol-wang, demigod sons of the celestial god Cheonji-wang. In both the mainland and Jeju, the crucial moment is always a flower-growing contest. Mireuk or Daebyeol-wang grows the (better) flower, but Seokga or Sobyeol-wang steals it while the other sleeps. The latter thus becomes the ruler of humanity and is the reason the present world is full of evil.

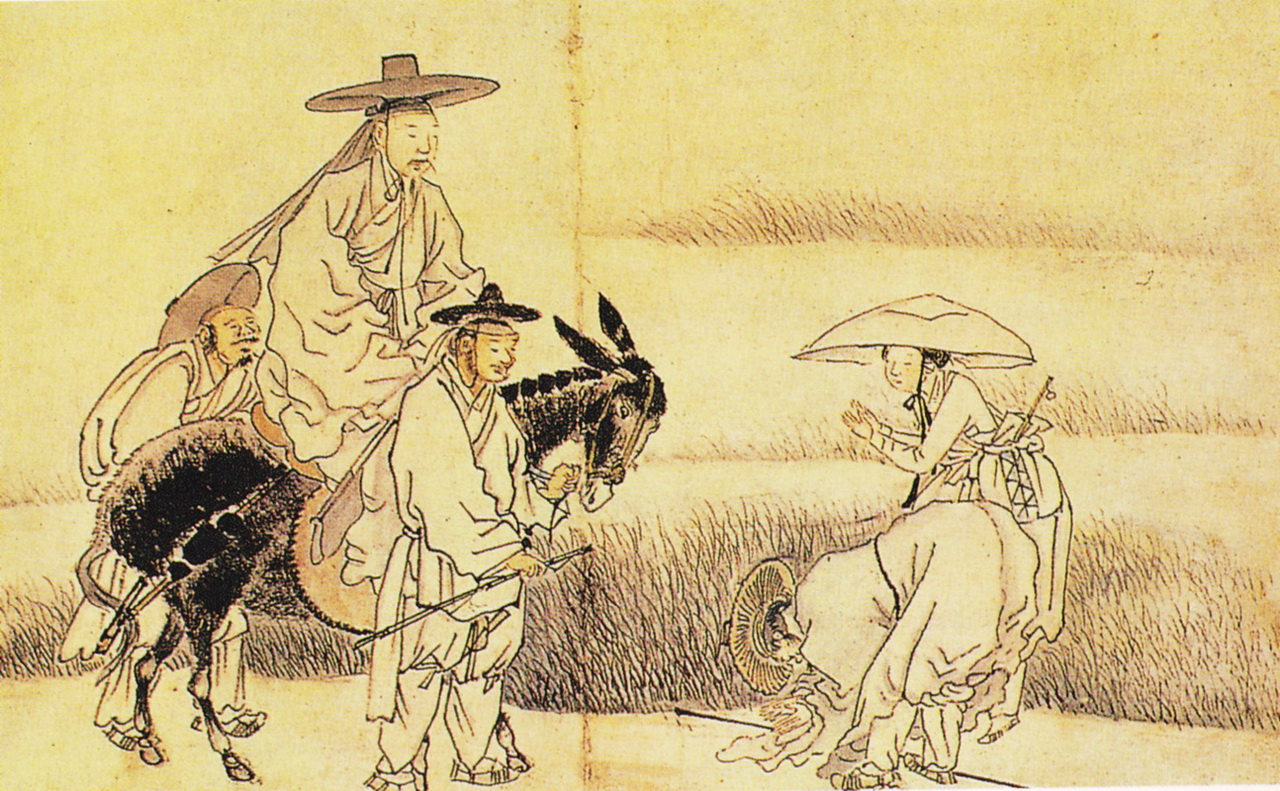
Peasants showing deference to an aristocrat in traditional Korea. In the Sunsan-chugwon narrative, class hierarchies appear when Seokga steals the creator god Mireuk's flower.

Throughout the mainland (except in the two eastern narratives), the contention begins when the new deity Seokga suddenly emerges to challenge Mireuk's rule and claim dominion over the present age. In the two Changse-ga hymns, Mireuk and Seokga engage in two duels of supernatural power. Both times, Mireuk is victorious and Seokga insists on another contest, concluding in the flower contest. In the Seng-gut, Seokga wins the initial two contests. Even so, he still cheats in the final flower contest, which Kim Heonsun uses as evidence that the episode was "a crucial component of the original creation narrative, which could never be changed or revised even if the context would suggest a logical contradiction". In the other narratives, the flower contest is the sole contention between the two gods. In all the mainland narratives except the Danggeum-agi, the contest is specified as a test to see which god can make a flower bloom out of their lap while they are both asleep. In all narratives, Seokga violates the stated rules by only pretending to sleep. When he sees that Mireuk has grown a blossom while he has not, he plucks Mireuk's blossom and places it in his own lap.

In all mainland narratives except the Danggom-agi norae, Mireuk awakes, sees that Seokga has stolen his flower, and predicts or curses that Seokga's blossom will quickly wither and that his age will be full of evil and suffering. In the Sam Taeja-puri, Mireuk says:

"Many will go hungry for lack of food to eat, and many will go naked for lack of clothes to wear. Beggars will be on each and every road. The famine years will come by, and every home will be full of wailing. Everywhere they go will be full of worry."

Mireuk then flees, ascends into heaven to become the celestial spheres, or retires to his native land; he plays no clear role in Seokga's new order.

In the Cheonji-wang bon-puri, the contention between the twins Daebyeol-wang and Sobyeol-wang is over the world of the living specifically; the winner will rule the living, and the loser will reign over the dead. The flower contest is generally associated with two riddles of wisdom. The details are also slightly different. The plant is grown in a silver jar, and sleeping is not one of the original terms but one proposed by Sobyeol-wang when he sees that his flower is black and withering while Daebyeol-wang's one is in full bloom. In any case, Sobyeol-wang swaps the plants while his older brother sleeps. In most versions, the result is evil on earth.

Daebyeol-wang the forlorn older brother spoke:

"Forlorn younger brother Sobyeol-wang! Though you shall go rule over the law of the living, many will be the murderers and traitors in the human world. Many will be the black thieves. When men are fifteen years old, many will cast aside their wives and look towards other men's wives. Women, too, when they are fifteen years old, many will cast aside their husbands and look towards other women's husbands."

But unlike Mireuk, Daebyeol-wang plays an important rule in the post-contest order as the ruler of the dead. Several versions of the Cheonji-wang bon-puri emphasize how Daebyeol-wang established justice for the dead, in contrast to the evil of the living world. Unlike Seokga, Sobyeol-wang often finds himself incapable of governing the living and begs his twin to rule instead. The older brother declines but does help his brother by shooting down the duplicated sun and moon, depriving non-humans of speech, and otherwise bringing about cosmic order, called the "great law". The "little law" of the living remains in Sobyeol-wang's hands.

Sobyeol-wang entered the country of the dead and [asked,] "Daebyeol-wang, good older brother, how are you ruling over the law of the dead?"

"I accord the law of the dead to the law of laws—governing sinners according to their sins, the poignant people according to poignancy, the lonely people according to loneliness, the pitiful people according to pity—and the law of laws becomes clear."

"[...] Older brother, please descend to the human world. I will go to the world of the dead."

"In whatever is done, a single win or loss is the end; how could there be another partition? Did you really descend to the human world even while you could not govern by the law of laws? Return to the human world. I will arrange the great law for you. For the little law, do as you will."

In one aberrant version, it is in fact Sobyeol-wang who brings about order in the world, although the cheating motif is retained. In all other versions with the contest motif, Daebyeol-wang is portrayed as the good twin and Sobyeol-wang's reign as resulting in evil.

The protagonists of the Siru-mal are Seonmun and Humun, twin sons of the celestial deity Dang-chilseong. The elder twin Seonmun becomes the ruler of Great Han, a mythicized version of China, while the younger Humun becomes the ruler of Lesser Han or Korea. There is no contest of any sort involved in this partition, and the narrative makes no moral judgement about the twins. Nevertheless, Seonmun and Humun parallel Daebyeol-wang and Sobyeol-wang in that it is the younger twin who becomes the ruler of the immediately present world.

=== Doubled sun and moon ===
Twentieth -century painting of moon and sun gods holding flowers, for ritual use by Seoul shamans

All mainland narratives except the Sam Taeja-puri (see below) and the truncated Danggom-agi norae, as well as the significant majority of Cheonji-wang bon-puri versions, state that there were at some point two suns and two moons.

The four northern narratives vary as to the circumstances of the episode. In Kim's Changse-ga, there were originally two suns and two moons until Mireuk destroyed one of each and used them to create the stars. In all other narratives, this role is played by the usurper Seokga. In both Jeon's Changse-ga and the Sam Taeja-puri, the usurpation of Seokga results in the disappearance of the sun and moon. In the Changse-ga, Seokga thrashes a grasshopper fifty times until it leads him to Mount Sumeru, where he finds two suns on a golden platter and two moons on a silver platter. The god releases them into the sky, but finds that the world is too hot during day and too cold during night. He thus removes one of each. The Sam Taeja-puri similarly describes Mireuk hiding the sun and moon in his sleeve when he ascends into heaven, with Seokga forced to retrieve them. But unlike in Jeon's Changse-ga, the god returns with only one sun and one moon.

In the Seng-gut, Seokga's usurpation results in the sun and moon doubling so that humanity alternately burns and freezes to death, leading to their near-extinction. Seokga is unable to resolve this calamity and embarks on a long journey to the Western Heaven to ask the Buddha there for help. The journey west has many episodes, but concludes in the destruction of the duplicated moon and sun in order to create the stars, the "map (or image) of the Son of Heaven of Zhongyuan," and the "map (or image) of the Son of Heaven of Korea."

The Sunsan-chugwon mentions only that there were two suns and two moons in the age of Mireuk, and there is no explanation as to why there is only one of each today. The Danggom-agi narrative does not directly describe the episode. But when Seokga's three sons (see section "Connection to the Jeseok bon-puri" below) set out to find their father, their mother tells them:

"So, my three boys, if you would find your father... he broke one sun and made way for only one of them when there were two and it was terribly hot; he broke one moon and made way for one of them when there were two and the moons were three feet and three inches.

In the Siru-mal, the demigod twins Seonmun and Humun shoot down the duplicated sun and moon with an iron bow, and hang the sun in the Palace of Jeseok and the moon in the Palace of Myeongmo. Where these locations refer to is unclear.

According to many Jeju shamans, the existence of two suns and two moons is simply the original state of the universe, unrelated to Sobyeol-wang's usurpation. The doubled suns and moons make humans desiccate to death during day, while their skin freezes and bursts during night. Concerning their destruction, there are two major variants. In some versions, Daebyeol-wang and Sobyeol-wang shoot down the sun and moon together before the flower contest, using bows that weigh a hundred or a thousand catties (roughly sixty or six hundred kilograms). In other versions, Daebyeol-wang removes the duplicated sun and moon after the contest, as part of his establishment of the "great law" for his younger brother mentioned above. In most versions of the Cheonji-wang bon-puri, the duplicate sun and moon fall into the eastern and western seas (Note: Some versions say the sun fell in the eastern sea and the moon in the western sea, while other versions say the opposite.) and are today kept by the Dragon Kings, the gods of the ocean. In a few divergent versions, the shards of the sun and moon become the stars.

Seo Daeseok argues that the two suns and moons symbolize drought and flood respectively, and that their destruction represents a process of mastering nature in order to promote agriculture. Park Jong-seong suggests that the twin suns and moons that govern the ancient world represent either Seokga and Mireuk or Daebyeol-wang and Sobyeol-wang, rivals that challenge each other for mastery over the world. Thus in the northern narratives, the fact that Mireuk no longer has any role to play after the usurpation is reflected in the fact that Seokga destroys the doubled sun and moon. By contrast, in the Cheonji-wang bon-puri, the unnecessary sun and moon are only shot down and ultimately preserved in the oceans. As Jeju is an island, the sun and moon appear to return to the sea every day before rising again the next morning or evening. Similarly, the human soul returns to the realm of the dead before reincarnation back into the living world. The underwater realm of the submerged sun and moon, where the celestial sun and moon are regenerated every day, thus parallels the realm of Daebyeol-wang where the human soul is revitalized at the end of every life.

=== Connection to the Jeseok bon-puri ===
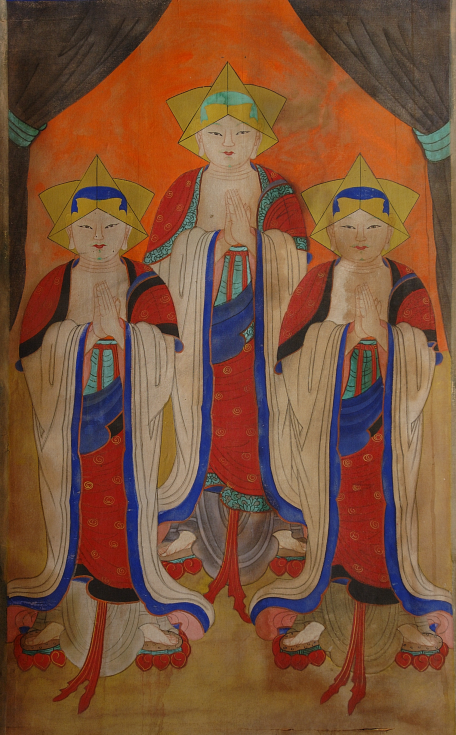
Painting of the Jeseok triplets at a shamanic shrine in Yongsan-gu, Seoul, nineteenth century.

The Jeseok bon-puri is a narrative hymn found throughout the Korean peninsula, with the following narrative. A nobleman has a virgin daughter named Danggeum-agi, who is impregnated by a supernaturally potent Buddhist priest from the Western Heaven who comes asking for alms. When her family discovers the pregnancy, they humiliate and expel her from the household. In southwestern Korea, the pregnant Danggeum-agi wanders about looking for the priest and gives birth to triplets after having found him. Her children are then made the Jeseok gods: deities of fertility. In northern and eastern Korea, Danggeum-agi gives birth to triplets alone while imprisoned in a pit, and it is her sons who go in search for their father. The priest tests the triplets to verify that they are indeed his sons. Once he has verified their parentage, he makes Danggeum-agi the goddess of childbirth and the triplets the Jeseok gods, and returns to the heavens. Despite the Buddhist veneer, the narrative stems from a pre-Buddhist myth in which a sky god impregnates an earth goddess in order to bring about fertility. Having conferred divinity upon Danggeum-agi and the triplets, the priest becomes an idle god with no active role in the world. It is instead his consort and children, the heroes of the Jeseok bon-puri, who are venerated by shamans today.

Except for the two Changse-ga hymns, all Korean creation narratives bear a close connection to the Jeseok bon-puri. The northern Seng-gut incorporates the creation myth as the first element and the Jeseok bon-puri as the final element of a long series of interrelated episodes. The Seng-gut narrative is not clear on whether Seokga is identical to the Buddhist priest who impregnates Danggeum-agi, although both gods are primarily referred to as seoin "sages". In the northern Sam Taeja-puri, Seokga seeks out Danggeum-agi after having retrieved the sun and moon. In the truncated and Buddhist-influenced eastern Danggom-agi norae narrative, the god Seokga has come to Korea to spread Buddhism. After the flower contest, the defeated Mireuk advises him that he will need to meet Danggeum-agi in order to do so. In the Danggeum-agi, the contest occurs after the impregnation of the heroine. On his way back, Seokga meets Mireuk and the two hold the flower contest for unclear reasons, although the defeated Mireuk's prophecy of evil in Seokga's world is preserved. Only the creation myth-related parts of the eastern Sunsan-chugwon narrative were transcribed, but the excerpt ends with a detailed description of Seokga's clothing as he goes to ask for alms. Such vivid descriptions of the priest's clothing being made just before the encounter with Danggeum-agi are characteristic of the region's Jeseok bon-puri narratives.

Lee Chang-yoon notes that Danggeum-agi personifies fertility. Seokga's usurpation deprives the world of both Mireuk and the primeval fertility that he embodies. The usurper must take Danggeum-agi's virginity and impregnate her, thereby subjugating her power to bear life, in order to make the world fertile again.

In Jeju and in the Dodang-gut tradition, the Jeseok bon-puri exists independently of the creation narrative, (Note: In Jeju, the Jeseok bon-puri is called the Chogong bon-puri. The Chogong bon-puri narrative is much more extended than the mainland equivalent, and the triplets do not become the Jeseok gods but instead become the first shamans on earth. After their death, they become judges of dead souls.) but close structural parallels are evident. In both the Siru-mal and the Cheonji-wang bon-puri, the celestial deity (Dang-chilseong or Cheonji-wang) descends to earth and impregnates an earthly woman (Maehwa-buin or Chongmyeong-buin). The woman gives birth to twins (Seonmun and Humun, or Daebyeol-wang and Sobyeol-wang) who go in search for their father and are ultimately made rulers (of China and Korea) or gods (of the dead and the living). The core of the narratives is thus identical to the northern and eastern Jeseok bon-puri versions, the main difference being that the creation narratives feature twins instead of triplets. Even certain details are shared. Seokga, Dang-chilseong, and Cheonji-wang all foretell the woman's pregnancy, while the triplets and both sets of twins are insulted for having no father.

The passing of authority from the father (Seokga) to the sons (Jeseok triplets), seen in the Jeseok bon-puri, is more apparent in both the Siru-mal and the Cheonji-wang bon-puri. Whereas Seokga remains the source of authority when he grants godhood to his children, Dang-chilseong plays no clear role in the twins becoming rulers of China and Korea. In Jeju, Sobyeol-wang openly flouts the rules of the flower contest set forth by his father. In one version of the Cheonji-wang bon-puri, the twins go as far as to find their father's empty throne and squabble over who will sit on it until part of it breaks off, but Cheonji-wang never appears.

Scholars disagree on whether the creation narrative was always closely associated with the Jeseok bon-puri, or whether this is an innovation.

== Relationship to Buddhism ==
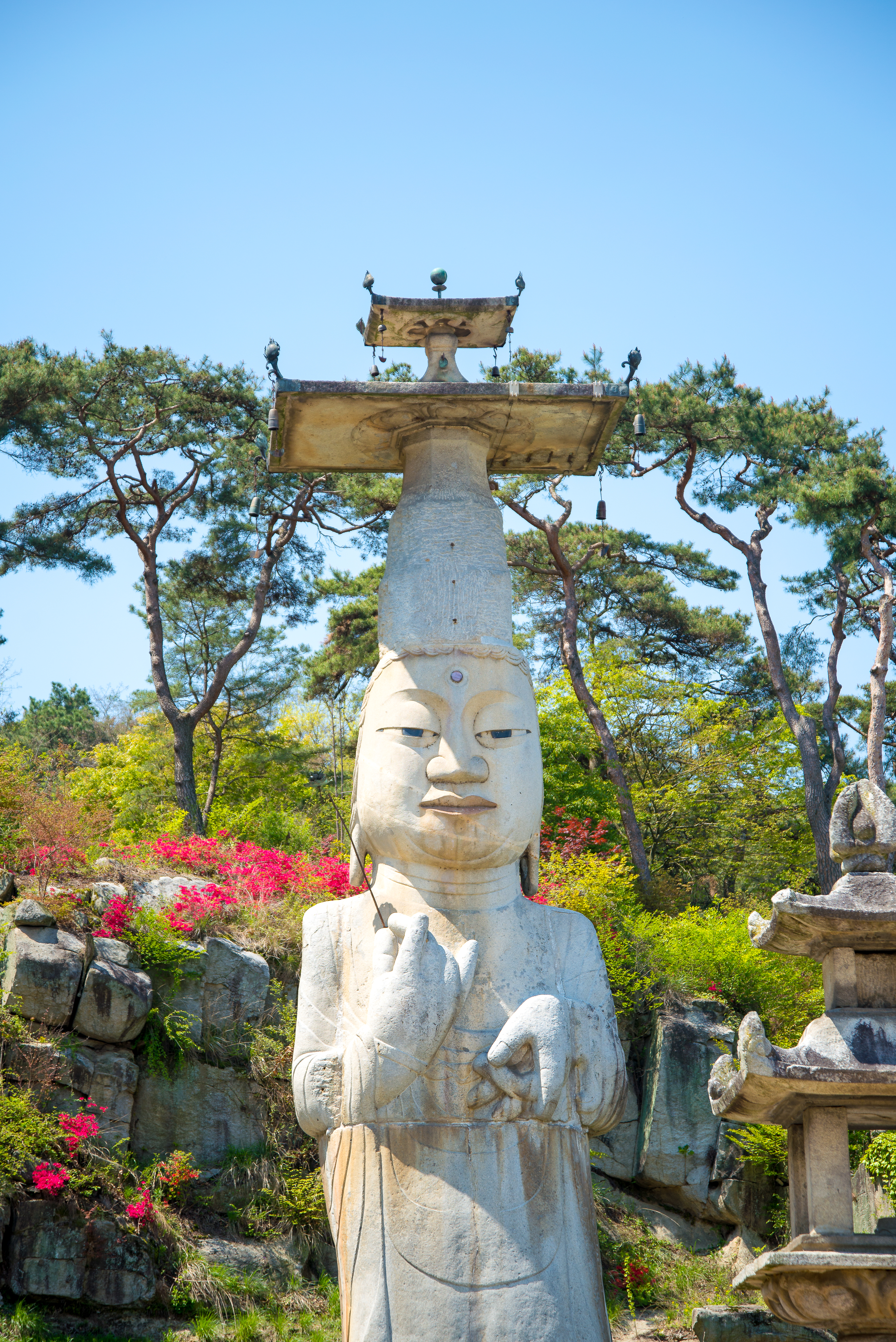
Tenth-century Korean statue of Maitreya Buddha, or Mireuk-bul

Most of the content of the mainland creation narratives appears to be unrelated to Buddhism. But (except for the Siru-mal) not only do the creator and the usurper both have unmistakably Buddhist names, those names are used in a strikingly different context from their associations in Buddhist orthodoxy. The creator of the ancient past is given the name "Mireuk," which is the Korean reading of Maitreya, the prophesied Buddha of the distant future. The usurper god responsible for suffering is named Seokga, the Korean pronunciation of Shakyamuni: the historical Buddha and the very founder of the religion. The gods presumably had indigenous names which were at some point replaced by the names of Buddhas.

The narratives thus show strong influence from East Asian Maitreya worship, which was popularized in Korea beginning in the late eighth century. Maitreya worshippers believe that the future world of the Maitreya Buddha will be a messianic paradise in stark contrast to the present world of the historical Buddha, which is characterized by human suffering. It is in this tradition that the association of the historical Buddha with the evil of the present world and Maitreya with a mythical paradise, whether located in the past or future, should be understood. The association between the historical Buddha and the usurper may have been further motivated by Korean shamans' antagonism towards the foreign religion. The shamanic tradition of the Hamhung region, the origin of two of the four northern creation narratives, features other myths that show hostility towards Buddhism. On the other hand, a flower contest myth involving a benevolent Maitreya and a malevolent Shakyamuni is widespread in East Asia. The episode may have been imported from elsewhere with the Buddhist influences already present, as discussed in the "Cross-cultural connections" section.

The gods of the Cheonji-wang bon-puri do not have Buddhist names and the Jeju narratives have negligible Buddhist influence, other than one version where the flower contest is held at a Mahavira hall under the supervision of a bodhisattva and the god Cheonji-wang preaches the doctrine of nidana to the impious man Sumyeong-jangja. The names "Daebyeol-wang" and "Sobyeol-wang" may mean "Great Star King" and "Little Star King" respectively.

== Northern narratives ==
=== Common elements in the northern narratives ===
The four northern narratives share a number of commonalities not found elsewhere in Korea. Only the Seng-gut and im's Changse-ga, both northern narratives, explain the precise means by which humanity was created. The contest between Mireuk and Seokga, which occurs after the creation of humanity, is preceded by two other contests of supernatural talent in all northern narratives but the Sam Taeja-puri. In all four narratives, Seokga (except in Kim's Changse-ga, where Mireuk plays this role) then embarks on a quest for either the missing sun and moon or the source of fire and water, which always involves the god thrashing a smaller being. In both the Seng-gut and Kim's Changse-ga, one of Seokga's first acts after the usurpation is to hunt, kill, and eat a deer. In both narratives, two of Seokga's followers refuse to eat the meat, calling it a desecration. These two men die and are transfigured into natural objects.

Korean creation narratives agree that humans preceded the flower contest, but most only copy the vague statements of Chinese philosophers that humans are one of the operating forces of the universe. The only exceptions are the northern Seng-gut, where humans are created from earth, and Kim's Changse-ga, where Mireuk grows insects into humans.

Mireuk held a silver platter in one hand and a gold platter in the other, and prayed towards heaven. Insects fell from heaven: five on the golden platter, five on the silver platter. He brought up those insects; the golden ones became men, the silver ones became women. The silver and golden insects that had matured were arranged into husbands and wives, and the people of the world were born.

There is scholarly consensus that the Seng-gut's creation from earth is a foreign element, with similar Chinese or Mongol myths a likely source, while the Changse-ga creation represents an indigenous Korean belief.

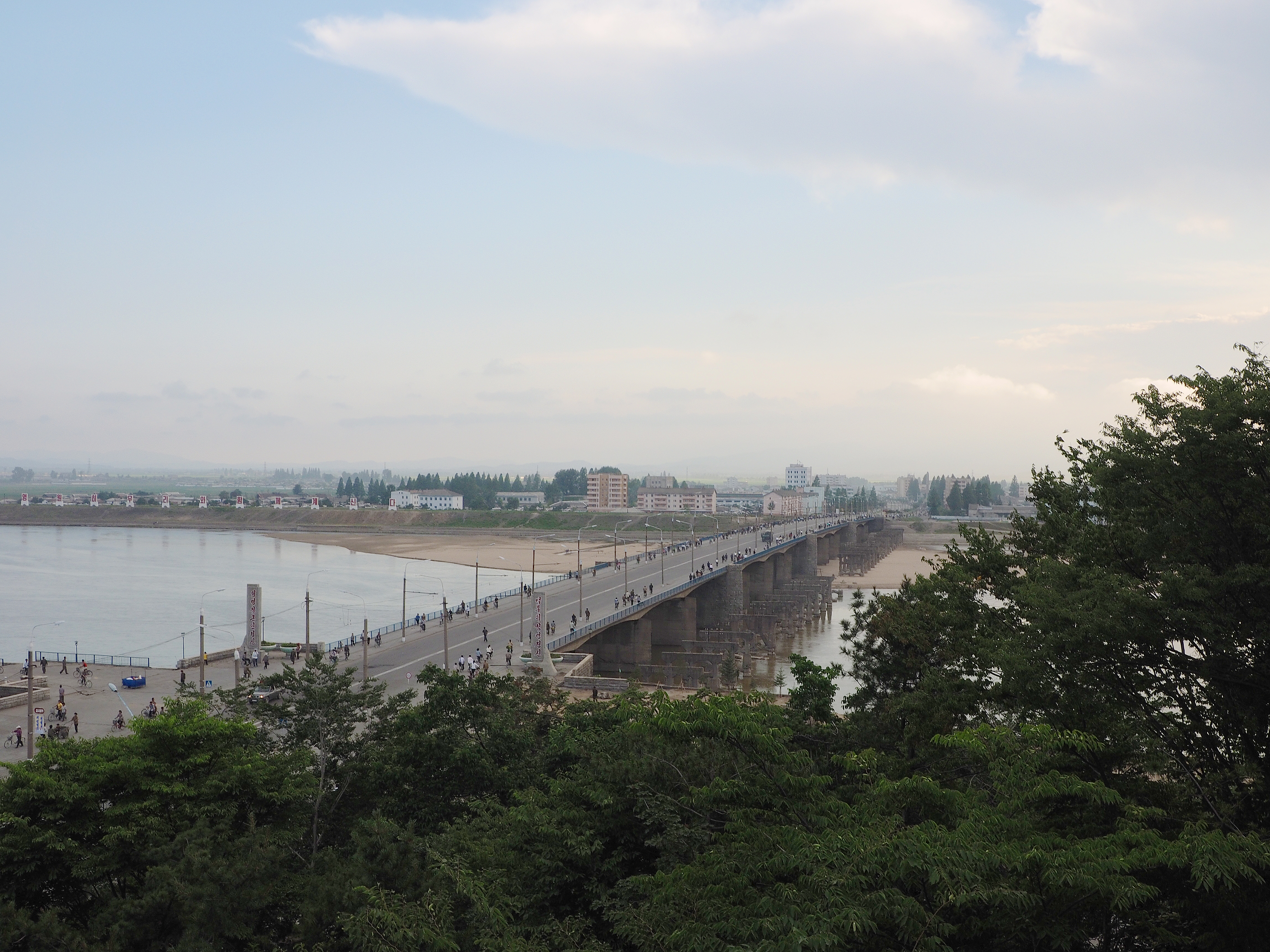
The Sŏngch'ŏn River in Hamhung, which Mireuk freezes in midsummer

While sharing the motif of three contests between Mireuk and Seokga, the two Changse-ga narratives and the Seng-gut do not agree on the first two contests. In Kim's Changse-ga, the first contest is to lower a bottle from a rope into the eastern seas. Mireuk uses a golden bottle and a golden rope, while Seokga uses a silver bottle and a silver rope. Seokga's rope breaks in the middle of the sea. He refuses to accept his defeat and proposes a new contest: to freeze the Sŏngch'ŏn River in midsummer. Mireuk invokes the winter solstice, while Seokga invokes the beginning of spring. The former is victorious. The latter again rejects the result, and the flower contest begins.

In Jeon's Changse-ga, the first contest is to shatter a bottle of liquor in midair and have the liquid continue to float in the air while the shards of the bottle fall to the earth. Mireuk succeeds, but Seokga's liquor spills to the earth as he breaks the bottle. But Seokga uses this defeat to justify his claim to the world, for his bottle has already given rise to the freshwater of the earth.

The bottle was hit and shattered and fell to the ground, and the liquor too fell... Mireuk said, "Look at that! It is far from being your age."

Seoga Yeol Sejon [Seokga] said, "[Rather,] it is becoming my age."

"How is it that it is becoming your age?"

"When it becomes my age, water will form first out of the Five Phases of Metal, Wood, Water, Fire, and Earth. The liquor has spilled to the earth, and the waters of the ditches and wells and the waters of the springs and the rivers have all formed from it."

The precise details of the second challenge are difficult to understand, but involves stacking rice stalks using a chicken's egg. As in the liquor contest, Mireuk succeeds and Seokga fails, but Seokga justifies his defeat by claiming that it is becoming his age because humanity will stack grain the way he has. The flower contest then ensues.

The Seng-gut is narrated from a perspective favorable towards Seokga. Its two contests are games of "immortal go" and "immortal janggi," and using a rock to moor a boat whose rigging is of sand. Seokga is victorious in both contests because he is cunning where Mireuk is foolish, but the latter rejects the results until the final flower contest.

In any case, Mireuk is defeated in all narratives. In Jeon's Changse-ga and the Sam Taeja-puri, this leads to the sun and moon's disappearance. Seokga retrieves the sun and moon by thrashing either a grasshopper (in the former narrative) or a chaedosa (Note: What exactly a chaedosa is remains unclear.) (in the latter) until it reveals the sun and moon's location. The motif of thrashing a small animal appears in Kim's Changse-ga and the Seng-gut as well, but in a different context. In the former, the creator god Mireuk wishes to discover fire and water. He thrashes a grasshopper, a frog, and a mouse each three times, but only the mouse reveals that fire is created by hitting iron on stone and that water springs up from inside a certain mountain. Mireuk rewards it by giving it dominion over all the rice boxes of the world. The Seng-gut episode is similar but involves a different god. Having defeated Mireuk and returned from his western journey, Seokga looks for fire and water. He thrashes a mouse three times, who reveals the secret of fire and is rewarded with priority over the world's food, then thrashes a frog three times, who reveals the source of water in return for priority over the world's waters.

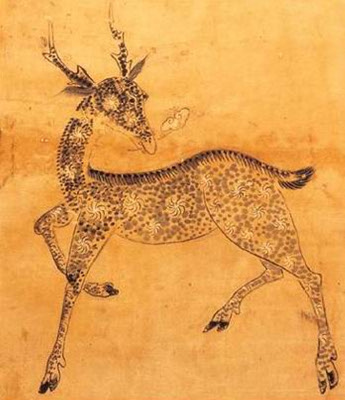
Deer, Korean folk painting

Kim's Changse-ga ends with Seokga going on a hunt with three thousand Buddhist priests. He kills a roe and roasts its meat, but two of the priests refuse to eat. The priests die and become rocks and pine trees. The same story is found in much more elaborated form in the Seng-gut. In the Seng-gut, Seokga sets off to the west with two followers to destroy the doubled sun and moon. On the way, he encounters a deer:

One deer is crossing the road, crying kkeong-kkeong.

"Ah, I cannot let that deer just cross the road."

He took out a six-hooked staff from his knapsack and aimed it at the deer and threw, and the deer was hit and spontaneously became ash.

"I cannot let this just be... Go gather firewood from the wild hills and firewood from the deep hills. Set them in the form of the character 井, and light up the wood and roast the deer."

While eating, Seokga spits some of the meat out into the water. This meat turns into the fish of the world. He then spits meat into the air, thus creating the birds. He spits a third time, and this meat becomes the beasts of the earth, including deer, tigers, and wolves. But his two followers refuse to eat the meat, saying that they would rather become Buddhas. Later in the journey, Seokga crosses a river on the backs of packed fish, but the fish refuse to allow the two who did not eat the meat to cross. When Seokga returns, he finds that the two have turned into large boulders. The god makes the boulders the gods of the Big Dipper and of a mythical southern counterpart of the Big Dipper.

=== Theories on the northern narratives ===
Park Jong-seong argues that Mireuk is a pastoral nomadic deity, while Seokga is a settled agricultural one. Mireuk's age is associated with the spontaneous generation of food and resources without human agricultural effort. The creator shows his power by freezing a river, which would have been useful for nomads to reach better pastures. By contrast, Seokga's feats are distinctly agricultural. The usurper invokes the thawing of ice at the beginning of spring, which marks the beginning of the farming season. His spilled liquor becomes the freshwater of the world, which is crucial to agriculture. In the second contest in Jeon's Changse-ga, Seokga explicitly mentions the fact that humans will stack grain the way he has. Park analyzes the flower contest in the same vein. Mireuk causes the plant to bloom naturally without human effort, but Seokga rejects this principle. The stealing of the flower may thus symbolize human intervention in nature in the form of agriculture. Park speculates that the myth may have formed during an ancient conflict between a nomadic and settled group, and that the current narratives reflect the nomads' perspective.

The Korean language has no grammatical gender and Mireuk's gender is not explicitly stated in the narratives, although his namesake the Maitreya Buddha is male. Korean folklore often features a primordial giant woman who shapes the terrain, and who is commonly described in terms similar to Mireuk. For instance, both the Jeju folklore of the giant woman Seolmun Dae-halmang and Kim's Changse-ga mention the giants having trouble with making large enough clothes, although Seolmun Dae-halmang obliges humans to make her clothes while Mireuk weaves his own clothes. Beginning with Park Jong-seong in 1999, several scholars have noted that Mireuk shows feminine characteristics. The argument that Mireuk is a goddess was fully developed by Shim Jae-suk in 2018, who argues that the first contest in Kim's Changse-ga is a metaphor for pregnancy, with the East Sea representing the amniotic fluid while the rope symbolizes the umbilical cord.

Shim further argues that Mireuk embodies primeval fertility, while Seokga stands for the hierarchical order of present society. Unlike the creator, Seokga lacks the ability to bring about his order by himself; he cannot generate the animals from nothing but must fashion them from the flesh of the deer. Shim cites folktales about deer-women to argue that the dismembered deer is Mireuk herself, explaining Seokga's antipathy towards the animal. The usurper is thus dependent on the creator for his act of creation. Similarly, Lee Chang-yoon notes that Mireuk and Seokga are figures of abundance and deprivation respectively. Seokga must impregnate Danggeum-agi, the goddess of fertility, in order to restore abundance to the world.

== Cheonji-wang bon-puri ==
=== Common elements in versions of the narrative ===
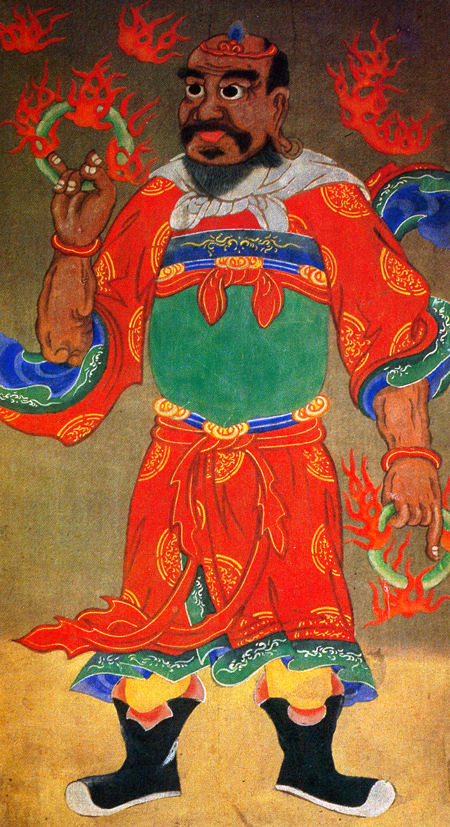
Nineteenth-century painting of Hwadeok-janggun, the fire god who destroys Sumyeong-jangja's house

Most Cheonji-wang bon-puri versions share an overarching narrative structure. Some time after the creation, the celestial deity Cheonji-wang descends onto earth, often to punish the impious Sumyeong-jangja. There, he impregnates an earthly woman. She gives birth to the twins Daebyeol-wang and Sobyeol-wang, who ascend to the heavenly realm of their father. The twins then shoot down one sun and one moon and engage in the flower contest, in either order. Compared to the mainland myths, which sometimes appear to be a list of disjointed episodes, the Cheonji-wang bon-puri has strong narrative coherence.

Many versions feature a man named Sumyeong-jangja, a wealthy evildoer of the ancient world. One day, the creator god Cheonji-wang descends to the human world to punish him, either for his hubris towards heaven or for refusing to hold the ancestral rites for his dead father. Shamans often mention how Sumyeong-jangja's house is defended by dogs, bulls, and horses so that even the god himself cannot enter. The god then sends forth warning omens to his house; bulls appear on top of his roof, mushrooms sprout in his kitchen, and his pots parade around the courtyard. Sumyeong-jangja is undaunted. In one version, he tells his servants to stir-fry the mushrooms.

Sometimes, Cheonji-wang responds by ordering his subordinate gods – such as the deities of fire, lightning, and thunder – to annihilate Sumyeong-jangja and his family. In many other versions, Cheonji-wang wraps an iron band or netting around Sumyeong-jangja's head. This makes his head hurt unbearably. But rather than repent, he tells his children or servants to split his head open with an ax. In the majority of stories, Cheonji-wang completes his punishment, such as by having the god of fire burn down Sumyeong-jangja's house. But in one account, Sumyeong-jangja successfully destroys the netting and escapes punishment. In the aforementioned aberrant account where Sobyeol-wang is portrayed positively, Cheonji-wang is so astonished by the man's bravado that he decides not to punish him. It is Sobyeol-wang who dismembers him after the flower contest, and his pulverized flesh turns into mosquitoes, bedbugs, and flies.

In some versions, Sumyeong-jangja does not appear at all. These allow for greater narrative continuity, as the story of the twins who destroy the doubled sun and moon follows the creation of two suns and two moons rather than the new and unconnected story of Sumyeong-jangja.

While on earth, whether this is in order to chastise Sumyeong-jangja or not, Cheonji-wang meets and sleeps with an earthly woman. As a person who "lives in poverty, and in devotion to the gods", the woman contrasts with the rich and impious Sumyeong-jangja. Shamans do not agree on her name, but some variant of Chongmyeong-buin (lit. 'clever lady') is common. The meeting often has three elements. First, Cheonji-wang enters Chongmyeong-buin's house, and her parents are distraught because there is no rice for the god. They borrow from Sumyeong-jangja's household, but the rice he lends is mixed with gravel. Second, Cheonji-wang and Chongmyeong-buin sleep together. Although the god usually requests the parents to send their daughter to him, the person who directly initiates the sexual encounter may be Chongmyeong-buin herself. In one version, Cheonji-wang laments her initiative:

"The butterfly ought to look for the flower, but the flower looks for the butterfly; many things will be wrong-side-up in the human world."

Finally, Cheonji-wang tells Chongmyeong-buin to name their sons Daebyeol-wang and Sobyeol-wang, gives her two gourd seeds (sometimes exchanging other tokens), and returns to the heavens.

Chongmyeong-buin does indeed give birth to twin sons. The two grow up and demand to be told who their father is, often after being insulted for being fatherless. Chongmyeong-buin reveals that their father is Cheonji-wang and gives them the two gourd seeds and any other tokens she might have. The twins plant the seeds, which grow into enormous vines that reach into the heavenly realm of the gods. Daebyeol-wang and Sobyeol-wang climb these vines to heaven. Their activities in their father's realm varies according to the shaman, but they usually eventually meet Cheonji-wang, who verifies their parentage. As mentioned, in one version only Cheonji-wang's empty throne appears. In at least two other versions, the twins reenact their birth and infancy:

[Daebyeol-wang says,] "If we are your children, father, we can only be so if we have sat on your lap. Could we be your children otherwise?"

"Then come sit here."

His older son Daebyeol-wang sits on his lap, and defecates and urinates, and says heung'ae [onomatopoeia for an infant's gurgle]...

[Now] Daebyeol-wang enters his great mother's petticoat by the left-side leg and comes out by the right-side leg. Sobyeol-wang enters his great mother's petticoat by the right-side leg and comes out by the left-side leg.

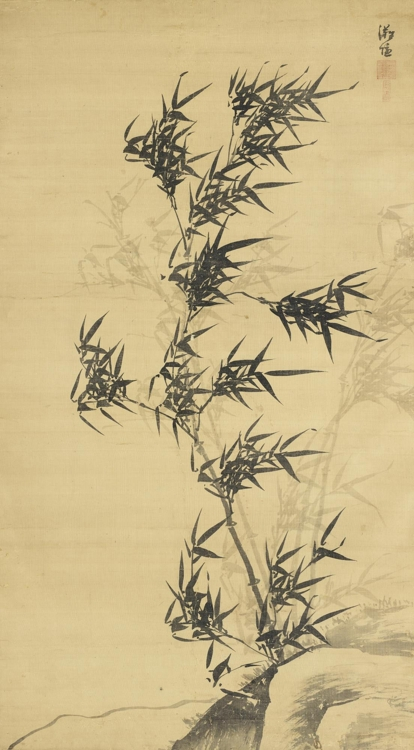
Bamboo in wind, by Yi Jeong. The bamboo appears in the Cheonji-wang bon-puri as an example of an evergreen that is hollow inside.

Shin Yeon-woo suggests that this strange episode symbolizes the twins being born again as more sacred beings in a sort of initiation rite.

The flower contest begins after the twins have reached heaven, usually on Cheonji-wang's orders. The contest is generally preceded or followed by two riddles of wisdom. Although the riddles too have variants, the most common structure is as follows. Sobyeol-wang asks Dabyeol-wang whether trees who keep their leaves in winter are hollow or solid inside. Daebyeol-wang responds that they have solid trunks, but the younger brother wins by giving the counterexample of the bamboo, whose stems are hollow. The next riddle goes similarly. Sobyeol-wang asks whether grass grows thicker in the valleys below or the hills above (or why grass grows thicker in the former). The older brother explains why grass is thicker in the valleys, but Sobyeol-wang refutes him by asking why humans have more hair above, on the scalp, then below, on the feet. In at least one version, it is Daebyeol-wang who asks the riddles and refutes Sobyeol-wang's responses.

In one account, it is Sobyeol-wang who asks the questions, but Daebyeol-wang wins by successfully answering his counterexamples. The bamboo keeps its leaves in winter because, although its internodes are hollow, bamboo leaves actually grow from the nodes, which are solid. Humans have more hair on the scalp than on the feet because newborns come out head-first during childbirth, and so the head is originally below.

=== Theories on the Cheonji-wang bon-puri ===
Park Jong-seong points out that the Cheonji-wang bon-puri implies that Sumyeong-jangja is superhuman. He enjoys great wealth, even as the story mentions how life was nearly unlivable because of the doubled sun and moon. The animals that guard his house are formidable enough to prevent Cheonji-wang from entering. The god sometimes fails to punish him at all. Park believes the core of the current Cheonji-wang bon-puri was brought to Jeju by the ancient migrants from mainland Korea who introduced ironworking to the island in the early first millennium. He thus interprets Sumyeong-jangja as an indigenous deity of the island and the conflict between him and Cheonji-wang as reflecting protracted hostility between his worshippers and the iron-using newcomers, explaining the role of fire and iron in the punishment of Sumyeong-jangja.

Choi Won-oh's interpretation focuses more on the narrative's current ritual purpose. He notes that the conclusion of most versions is the creation of the cosmic gawp (divide) between the world of the living and the dead, with Sobyeol-wang ruling the living and Daebyeol-wang establishing his law for the dead. The purpose of the story is thus to convey the fundamental principles of human life and death, explaining its prominent place in Jeju ritual. Choi divides the versions into two categories, depending on whether Sumyeong-jangja appears or not. In versions without Sumyeong-jangja, the story of the twins follows directly from the mention of the doubled sun and moon during creation. The problem to be solved is therefore a cosmic one that is resolved by earthly beings, and the flower contest is part of the twins' establishment of cosmic order. Choi calls these stories a cosmogonic myth, using Mircea Eliade's distinction between the cosmogonic myth that describes the cosmic creation and the origin myth that continues and completes the cosmogony by describing the subsequent transformations of the world.

By contrast, the introduction of Sumyeong-jangja creates a narrative break. Reversing the direction of the other versions, the man poses an earthly problem to be resolved by the celestial Cheonji-wang, while it is not the god but his sons who create the gawp between the living and dead. Choi thus classifies these versions as an origin myth about human life and death. These versions also emphasize the evils of human society that result from the younger twin's rule. Choi Won-oh notes that the story here appears to project the ancient suffering caused by Sumyeong-jangja into the age of Sobyeol-wang. These Cheonji-wang bon-puri variants thus present a pessimistic outlook on humanity, for whom the suffering brought on by the likes of Sumyeong-jangja will always be a fact of life.

== Cross-cultural connections ==
=== The "Flower Contest" ===
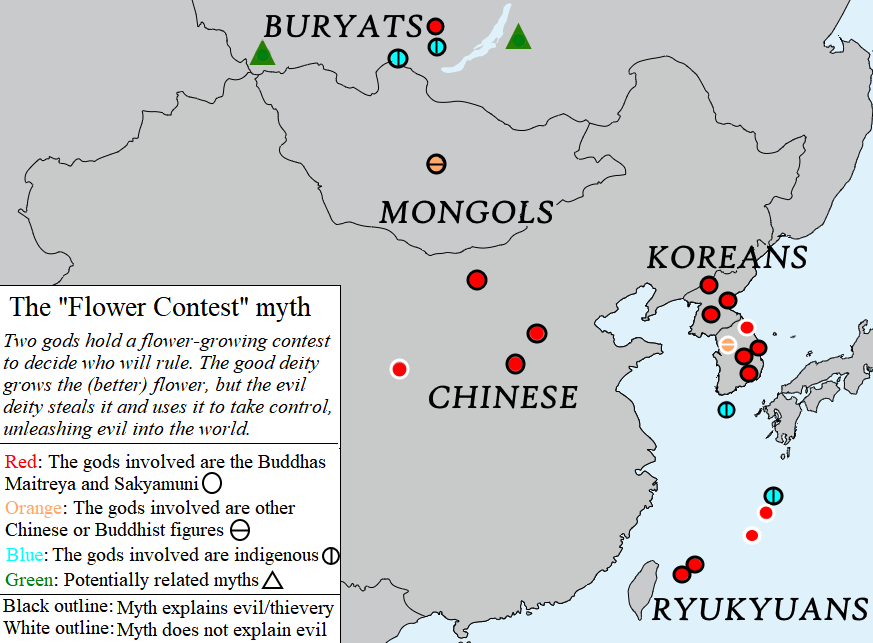
Location of attested flower contest myths. Some dots in Korea and the Ryukyus represent multiple different attestations combined for lack of space.

The flower contest between Mireuk (the future Maitreya Buddha) and Seokga (the present Shakyamuni Buddha) for control over the human world appears in the same format, with the identical characters, in many regions of East and Inner Asia. The first written documentation of the myth comes from a Chinese text published in 1616 by the Way of Yellow Heaven, a Ming-era Chinese salvationist religion active in Shanxi Province in northern China. Its account closely parallels the Korean episodes. Maitreya is the older brother and Shakyamuni is the younger. They hold a flower contest to decide who will descend into the world first, but Shakyamuni steals his brother's blossom while the other sleeps. Maitreya allows him to go into the world first, but predicts that his age will be a lawless one.

The Maitreya-Shakyamuni contest myth is also found throughout the Ryukyu Islands, even though Buddhist veneration of Maitreya did not exist there historically. In Miyako Island, Miruku-potoke (the local name for the Maitreya Buddha) is believed to be an ugly god who arrives from China to create humans, animals, and crops. The handsome god Saku-potoke (Shakyamuni Buddha) then challenges him to a flower contest and steals the blossom while the other sleeps. Miruku-potoke is thus defeated and forced to return to China, which is why China is a prosperous country while Miyako is not. A very similar story exists on nearby Yonaguni Island, although the Miruku there is female. The highlight of the Yonaguni harvest festival is a procession involving a person in a Miruku mask reenacting the goddess, as she is thought to "play the leading role as bringer of wealth, prosperity, and happiness". The myth is also found in Okinawa and the Amami Islands, but in Okinawa the story has been reduced to folktales with no religious significance.

Three Mongolic groups, the Buryats, the Khalkha, and the Ordos Mongols, also share the myth. In all versions, the cheating has a negative impact on the world. The Buryat flower contest has a variant that involves Maidari-Burkhan (Maitreya Buddha) and Shibegeni-Burkhan (Shakyamuni), in which the contention is over which god will give life to the first human, and a variant with indigenous gods. In the latter version, the contest for the world is held between the sons of the creator Churmusen Tengri Khan. The eldest son steals the youngest son's flower while the latter sleeps. The latter becomes Erlik, ruler of the world of the dead, but warns that his brother's people will live no more than a hundred years. Manabu Waida notes parallels with the Cheonji-wang bon-puri.

The Tungusic neighbors of the Buryats have a similar myth but with key differences; the contest is to grow a tree and not a flower, and the benevolent god prevails because there is no cheating involved.

Manabu Waida suggests that the myth was created in Inner Asia under the influence of Zurvanite Zoroastrianism, noting the good-evil dualistic cosmology of the myth and drawing parallels between the Zoroastrian twins Ahura Mazda and Angra Mainyu and rival brothers such as Daebyeol-wang and Sobyeol-wang. According to Waida, the theonyms were replaced with Maitreya and Shakyamuni under the influence of the Mongols' Tibetan Buddhism, and this myth was then disseminated from Inner Asia to Korea. Lee Pyungrae proposes two other possibilities. The first is that the myth was formed by Maitreya-worshipping Chinese salvationist religions and then spread to China's neighbors. The second is that a plant-growing contest is an indigenous Siberian myth, accounting for the existence of the Tungusic story which appears to be share an origin with the flower contest, which at some point spread southwards into the Korean Peninsula.

=== The "Multiple Suns" Motif ===
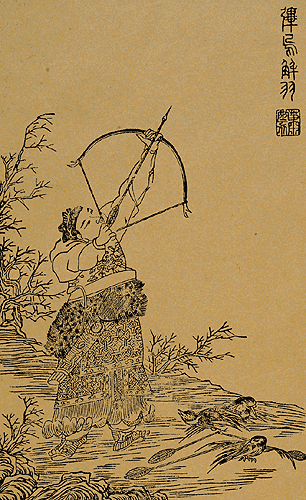
Houyi about to shoot down a sun, early Qing Chinese depiction.

==== Overview ====
The motif of destroying superfluous suns also has analogues throughout East Asia, including in both China and Japan. Famously, the Chinese hero Houyi shoots down nine out of ten suns, leaving only one in the sky. The Chinese myth was already present by the late fourth century BCE, and Waida believes that other East and Inner Asian stories involving the motif were probably created via its influence. But he notes that the Korean motif of superfluous moons is absent in China and (besides Korea) is "found only in a more narrowly confined area of Siberia" such as among the Nivkh people and the Tungusic Nanai people. Kim Heonsun references South Korean scholars who have identified potential analogues among peoples south of Korea as well, including an indigenous Taiwanese myth that there were once two suns and two moons which led to year-long days and nights until a hero shot down one each, a myth of sixty-six suns and seventy-seven moons among the Yi people of southwestern China, and a Tai myth that nine moons and eight suns once made the world very hot.

Further studies about the motif of a cultural hero shooting down suns state that the motif is present among Taiwanese indigenous peoples ("34 versions among 8 ethnic groups"), as well as in "Borneo, Sumatra, the Malayan peninsula, India, southwestern China, northeastern China, Manchurian marginal area". They are found locally as a myth from the Apatani people and other tribal populations of central Arunachal Pradesh, as well as in "upland Southeast Asia and southwest China".

Professor Loreto Todd collected a West African (Cameroon) tale titled Di sohn, di nait an di mun ("Sun, Night and Moon"), a tale considered by folklorist Dan Ben-Amos as containing the folk motif of the culture hero shooting the extra suns.

==== Regional variations ====
In a Japanese tale, The Mole and the Frog, there was a time when seven suns existed, which burned the world in intense heat. The mole decided to shoot six of them down. (Note: According to Keigo Seki's "Types of Japanese Folktales", variants of this legend were recorded in compilations from Fukuoka, Kumamoto and Kagoshima.) (Note: The stories where a mole shoot the sun were classified in Hiroko Ikeda's index of Japanese tales as type 296, "Shooting the Sun" (Taiyoo o Iru or Iwatake), with 5 versions registered.)

Among the Miao people of Southeast China, a similar episode of multiple suns is recorded in some of their folk epics: the excessive amount of suns begins to melt the earth and hero Hsangb Sax climbs up a tree to shoot them down to only one. In a version of the story, a legendary personage named Yaj Yuam or Kaj Yuam (a type of "Heavenly Archer") shoots down eight superfluous suns, leaving only one left. The ninth sun (which appears as female in the tale) hides out of fear and will only come out with the crowing of the rooster.

In a story from the Yi people, cultural hero Zhyge Alu, hero of extraordinary parentage, shoots down the suns and moon.

In a story from the Hani people, The Rooster and the Nine Suns, nine suns existed in the heavens, at the dawn of the world, but their heat was so scorching nothing would grow on earth. However, the skilled archer Erpupolo shoot down eight suns, causing the ninth to hide itself.

In a Chinese cosmogonic myth, solar deity Xihe gives birth to ten suns. Each of the suns rests upon a tree named Fusang (possibly a mulberry tree). The ten suns alternate during the day, each carried by a crow (the "Crow of the Sun"): one sun stays on the top branch to wait its turn, while the other nine suns rest on the lower branches. In some versions of the story, the ten suns rise at the same time and have to be shot down by hero Yi. This narrative is also said to be "a popular motif in [Chinese] myths".

Versions of the motif have also been located in narratives from the Barga Mongols, the Mongolic peoples (Buryats, Oirats, Khalkha Mongols), as well as Tuvans, Evenks and Altai people. In one version, an archer named Erkei-Mergen (or Erkhe-Mergen) offers to shoot down seven suns; when he prepares to shoot the seventh, a martin passes in front of the arrow and its tail parts in two. Professor Charles Bawden provided another version of the tale, titled Erkhii Mergen (which he translated as "Marksman Thumb"), wherein the bird that cross the hero's aim is a swallow.

Variations of the legend also exist among Northeast Asian populations. In a tale from the Golds people (Nanai) of the Amur region, the three suns and three moons disturbed human existence on earth, until a hero shot down the extra luminaries with his bow. In a version recorded from the Gilyaks (Nivkh), the hero flies on the back of a reindeer to perform the heroic deed of eliminating the suns and moons in the sky.

Professor Stuart Blackburn stated that versions of the myth in Arunachal Pradesh show the multiple suns shot down, "often by a frog with bow and arrow", like in an Adi tale. In an Apatani story, a spirit named Tamu shoots down a second sun, named Chanter Danyi, and a second moon, named Chanter Pulo - both created by "evil spirits" led by one Giirii.

In a tale from the Lepcha people of Sikkim, The toad kills one of the two suns, two suns - brothers - alternate during day and night, but there is never darkness and the world suffers from intense heat. However, the "edible toad" (tuk-blota-luk) fashions an arrow of cockscomb plant to kill one of the suns. De Beauvoir Stocks also noted versions of it in Darjeeling and Pemionchi, where the suns and moons numbered 7 or 8 and the hero was the water frog.

Author James Riordan published a version of the tale he sourced from the Udege people. In this tale, a hunter named Adyga, who lives by the Amur River, shoots one of two sun brothers. The felled sun brother becomes the moon.

== See also ==
- Chinese creation myth
- Japanese creation myth
- Numit Kappa (Meitei epic)
- Mongol mythology
- Vietnamese mythology
