= Seng-gut narrative =

Korean shamanic narrative from Hamgyong Province

- Hangul: 셍굿무가
- Hanja: 셍굿巫歌 (聖人굿巫歌)
- Revised Romanization: Seng-gut muga
- McCune–Reischauer: Seng-gut muga

The Seng-gut narrative is a Korean shamanic narrative traditionally recited in a large-scale gut ritual in Hamgyong Province, North Korea. It tells of the deeds of one or multiple deities referred to as "sages," beginning from the creation of the world. It combines many stories that appear independently in other regions of Korea into a single extended narrative. In the first story, the deity Seokga usurps the world from the creator, creates animals from deer meat, and destroys a superfluous sun and moon. In the second, the carpenter Gangbangdek builds a palace for the gods, loses a wager to a woman, and becomes the god of the household. In the third and fourth stories, a boy who does not talk until the age of ten becomes the founder of a new Buddhist temple and melts a baby into iron to forge a temple bell. In the fifth, the same priest destroys a rich man for having abused him. Finally, the priest makes his three sons the gods of fertility, ending the story. The narrative has a strong Buddhist influence.

== Source and ritual context ==
The Seng-gut narrative was recited on September 26, 1965, by Gang Chun-ok, a female shaman from Hamhung who had fled North Korea during the Division of Korea. The Seng-gut was a large-scale gut ritual in the Hamgyong region, in which shamans beseeched the gods for long life, sons, and fortune generally. Seng or seoin means "sage; holy person" in Northwestern Korean, and is here used to refer to a variety of shamanic deities that appear in the garb of a Buddhist priest. With the exception of the Gangbangdek story, the narrative has a strong Buddhist influence throughout.

According to scholar Kim Heonsun, the only transcription (by ethnologists Lim Seok-jae and Chang Chu-keun) is riddled with serious orthographic errors and mistranscriptions.

== Myth ==
=== Creation narrative ===
The Seng-gut narrative opens with the spontaneous generation of the universe, as heaven opens in the direction of zi and earth opens in the direction of chou. This statement is copied verbatim from the philosophical cosmogony proposed by the eleventh-century Chinese philosopher Shao Yong. Humans are created from red clay, which is why they return to the earth upon death. In this primeval world, birds and horses can talk, trees can walk, horses have horns and bulls have manes, and dogs have combs and chickens have ears. This is followed by a discussion of the Three Sovereigns and Five Emperors of Chinese religion, from Heavenly Sovereign to Yu the Great, founder of the Xia dynasty.

The Indian sage (Northwestern Korean: 서인 seoin) Seokga, the Korean version of Shakyamuni 'Sakya sage', a title of the Buddha, studies in the Western Heaven (Sukhavati) for nine years. After entering the human world to preach Buddhism in the East and Christianity in the West, he finds Korea under the rule of the creator god Mireuk, the Korean version of the name 'Maitreya'. He tells him to hand over Korea, but the creator refuses, and a series of disputes ensues. First, Seokga and Mireuk play "immortal go" and "immortal janggi." Next, they each try using a rock to moor a boat whose rigging is of sand. Seokga is triumphant both times, because Mireuk is "foolish" while Seokga is "full of ruses and full of artifice, with cunning stratagems." Mireuk refuses to accept his defeats. Finally, they hold a contest to grow a flower while both are asleep. Mireuk sleeps genuinely, but Seokga only pretends to sleep. When a chrysanthemum blooms near the sleeping Mireuk, Seokga plucks it and places it in his own lap. When Mireuk awakes and realizes Seokga's cheating, he departs but curses the world:

"When it becomes your age, humans will be born like millet grains. From the day they are born they will have thievery in their hearts. There will be two moons in the sky and two suns in the sky. When it is night, things will freeze three feet and three inches, and when it is day, things will burn three feet and three inches, and humanity will freeze to death and burn to death and the humans that survive will be unhulled grains in hulled millet grains. Humans will be born with thievery in their hearts; there will be bandits at every ten leagues, there will be thieves at every five leagues, there will be evildoers inside every door."

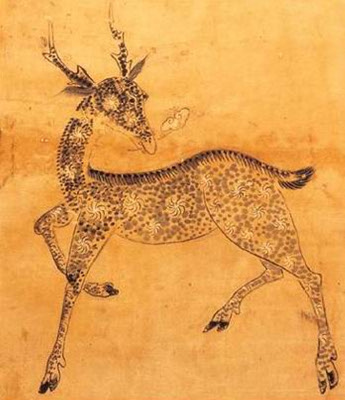
Deer, Korean folk painting

After Mireuk's departure, there are indeed two suns and two moons in the sky, so that life is unlivable for humanity. Seokga resolves to return to the Western Heaven to end this calamity. On the way, he finds a deer crying while crossing the road. The god throws a six-hooked staff at the animal, immediately killing it. He orders the deer to be roasted for its meat, but his two servants refuse to eat the meat, saying that they would rather become Buddhas. While eating, Seokga spits out some of the deer meat into the waters, thereby creating the fishes of the world. Then he spits towards the sky and creates the birds. He spits a final time, and the meat crawls and runs away as the animals of the earth.

Making his way west, Seokga encounters a river three thousand leagues wide. The fish—his creations—allow him to cross on their backs, but scatter when his two servants attempt to cross. Going alone, Seokga meets a beautiful woman named Dongjibaek who lives below the road and a hideous woman named Sesi-aegi who lives above the road. Only the latter tells him the directions to the Western Heaven. When Seokga finally reaches the Western Heaven, a Buddha there tells him to thread three thousand beads together with a single string. He asks the two women for help, but only Sesi-aegi reveals the solution: smear the beads with honey and tie the string to a fire ant, which will thread the beads together as it is lured by the honey. The Buddha then destroys the doubled sun and moon for Seokga and uses them to create the stars, the "map of the Son of Heaven of Zhongyuan," and "the map of the Son of Heaven of Korea."

On his return to Korea, Seokga confers divinity to Sesi-aegi but dooms Dongjibaek to working in the smithy. He crosses the river on the backs of fish again and discovers that his two servants have turned into giant boulders. He makes one the god of the Seven Stars of the Northern Dipper, and the other the god of the (mythical) Seven Stars of the Southern Dipper. Back in Korea, Seokga thrashes a mouse three times until it reveals the secret of making fire (to strike iron on stone) and thrashes a frog three times until it reveals the secret to finding water (to dig for aquifers underground).

Finally, the god teaches humanity about the inevitability of death; the implication is that death did not exist before Seokga entered Korea. He is eventually cremated. He ascends into heaven, and his ashes crystallize into śarīra pearls.

=== Gangbangdek narrative ===
The Jade Emperor wishes to build a new palace and attempts to enlist the help of a sage (seoin) named Gangbangdek, a deity reincarnated as a human carpenter. The spider volunteers to bring him and weaves a web in front of Gangbangdek's door, but the carpenter kills the spider. The owl then goes to bring him to heaven, but Gangbangdek kills the bird with an arrow. A god named Eotteoki reveals that Gangbangdek is protected from the gods by an amber headband brooch, a coral topknot pin, and a blade made of wood from a lightning-struck peach tree. Eotteoki strikes the man with a sleeping disease, so that he falls asleep even while standing. Gangbangdek takes a bath to rouse himself. When he drops his brooch, his pin, and his blade, Eotteoki spirits his soul away.

Gangbangdek tells the Jade Emperor that he will need to use a tree that grows on Mount Penglai, whose branches number ten thousand and whose roots stretch out for three thousand leagues, in order to build the palace. The god commissions three thousand human craftsmen and three thousand oxen to help him in the project, and three thousand people and three thousand oxen fall dead in the human world so that their souls can cut down the tree.

While transporting the Penglai tree to the Jade Emperor's realm, Gangbangdek encounters a weaving woman named Mosi-gakssi, who proposes a challenge to the carpenter. She will weave a thousand dong (two million Chinese feet, or six hundred kilometers) of ramie cloth alone. If she finishes weaving before Gangbangdek finishes the palace, he must give all his pay to her. If Gangbangdek finishes first, she will gift him all thousand dong of cloth. Mosi-gakssi, who weaves with her loom amid the clouds, finishes earlier by a few days. The Jade Emperor gives her all of the carpenter's pay. Gangbangdek is incensed and curses the palace.

Soon upon making it his residence, the Jade Emperor falls ill. He consults his servants, who tell him that he must venerate Gangbangdek as Seongju, the god of the household. The Jade Emperor holds an enormous gut for the carpenter, involving tens of thousands of dong of cloth and tens of thousands of seok of rice. The Jade Emperor's disease is cured, and Gangbangdek becomes worshipped widely as Seongju today.

=== Miraculous birth and temple bell narratives ===
A wealthy couple, Ching'ae-dure and Ching'ae-seonbi, are childless even as they are nearing forty. One day, a Buddhist priest and sage (seoin) comes on an alms round. Chinag'ae-dure asks him if there is any way she can have a child, promising the priest as much food as he could possibly want. The priest tells her to pray with her husband at the mythical Golden Temple, and vanishes without receiving any food. After praying at the Golden Temple, Ching'ae-dure gives birth to a beautiful boy, but he never cries as a baby and has not learnt to speak even by the age of ten. When the sage returns, Ching'ae-dure asks him if he knows how to make the child speak. He tells her to pray with her husband at the Golden Mountain to the god of the Seven Stars. When they do so, their son speaks for the first time, while dancing an immortal's dance:

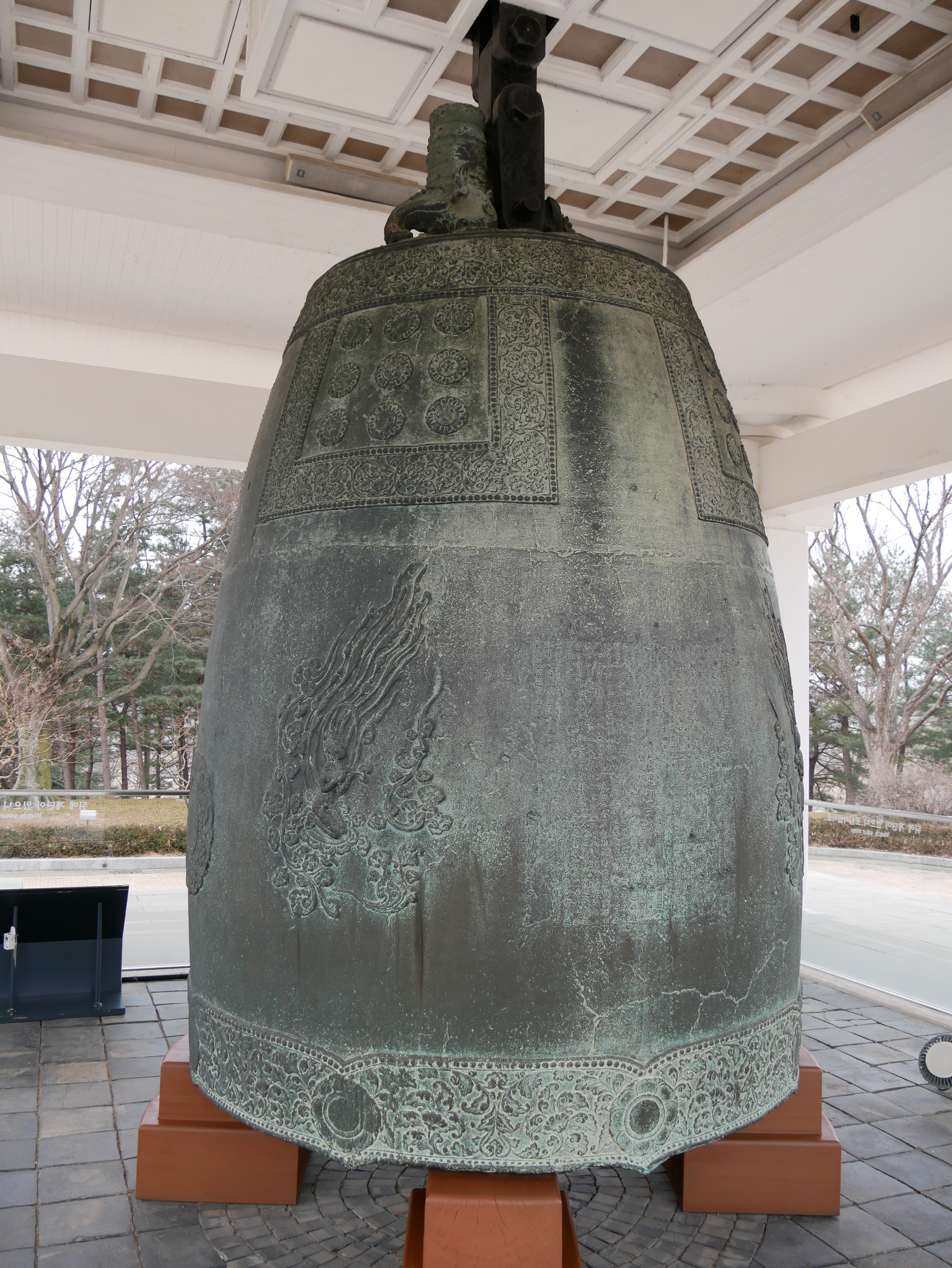
Korean Buddhist temple bell

"Mother, look at how I act. Father, look at how I am. I will go to the Buddhist temple where I was made and become a sage."

Though his parents are devastated, the boy leaves forever. He goes to the Golden Temple, whose priests abuse and expel him for dancing an immortal's dance. The boy goes to a nearby hill and curses the temple, which is then "swept away." The priests of the temple who abused him are transformed into rat snakes. The boy-sage takes the Buddha statue and the remaining priests to found the new Geumgang Temple at the mythical Mount Anhe.

The sage sends his priests to the Eight Provinces of Korea to collect iron to forge a bell for Geumgang Temple, and goes personally to the house of a man named Wonsan-durei because he knows that something strange is there. Wonsan-durei's family is desperately poor, and the wife says that they cannot afford to give him "cast iron, or raw iron, or even broken iron"; all they have is their three-year-old son Wonmaek. The sage convinces her to donate at least Wonmaek's spoon and returns to the temple. Though the priests pool together and melt their iron, they find that it cannot be forged into a bell. The sage tells a priest to bring Wonmaek to him, and the priest persuades the mother to give him the child under the condition that he be returned once the "great business of the temple" is done.

The webs of purseweb spiders sprout on the road by which Wonmaek goes to the temple. When the child arrives, the priests mix blood from his middle finger into the molten iron, but forging is still impossible. Finally, Wonmaek volunteers to enter the molten iron himself, on the condition that he be wrapped in silk. The child is thus melted alive into the iron. The bell is finally forged with the sacrifice, but the priests find that they have made a talking bell that speaks with Wonmaek's voice. The sage holds a shamanic ritual to appease and liberate the child's soul. Three years later, the bell has become unusable, its surface covered with moss. Fifteen workers destroy the bell, and shattering it into pieces. The shards are retrieved by shamans, who reforge them to make their sacred drums.

=== Jangja narrative ===
While on an alms round, the sage of Geumgang Temple journeys to the house of a rich man (Korean: jangja) in Hamgyong Province who has accumulated wealth for a thousand years. When the man refuses to give him alms and abuses him, the sage curses the house. His pots will go on walks, mushrooms will sprout in his rice bags, his thousand-year-old copper columns will be worm-eaten, and so forth, and when such things happen he should know that he is "done for." The rich man's daughter-in-law warns him that the sage is cursing them, but he admonishes her for wanting to let vagrants in the house. The daughter-in-law secretly visits the sage with alms and asks him to forgive her father-in-law, saying that he has been senile for three years. The priest tells her to leave the house the next morning and to never look back, and vanishes.

The next morning, it is all as the sage has said. The rich man's pots are walking by themselves, there are mushrooms in his rice bags, and worms are eating into copper columns. The daughter-in-law begs her father-in-law to understand the situation, but he remains stubbornly ignorant.

"Father, what should do we do? The priest who came yesterday was completely right... He said that we would be done for."

"Huh, what do you mean, 'be done for'? You have just two legs and you walk just fine, so what's wrong with something that has three legs [pots] taking walks?... As for the giant mushrooms, those are things people eat. You should go prepare them for the table. And about the copper columns that you say are worm-eaten, those things are a thousand years old. Even trees born this year have worms on them."

Hearing this, the daughter-in-law flees the house, taking only the family kitten with her. After some time, she hears her father-in-law say:

"My daughter-in-law! My daughter-in-law! Save me, please!"

She looks back. The rich man's house has been replaced by a pond, with only a pair of mallard ducks to be seen. The woman and the kitten immediately turn into rock.

=== Jeseok bon-puri ===
A very rich man and his family go to Seoul, leaving only their virgin daughter Seji-aegi behind. Knowing this, the sage of Geumgang Temple visits the mansion as a Buddhist priest asking for alms. Seji-aegi tells her servant to give him rice, but the priest receives it in a bottomless bowl so that all of it spills. When she asks him why he will not accept her alms, he says that he will not receive any rice that she has not offered him personally, grain by grain. She does so, and the sage's robe and her skirt blow, touch, and tear in the southeast wind. When the sun sets, Seji-aegi allows the priest to sleep in a back annex of the mansion. When he claims he cannot stand the smell of horse leather, she moves him to a room in the main complex. The priest complains again about the smell of shoes, and he, Seji-aegi, and the servant decide to stay up all night together. The servant falls asleep, and the girl and the priest have sex.

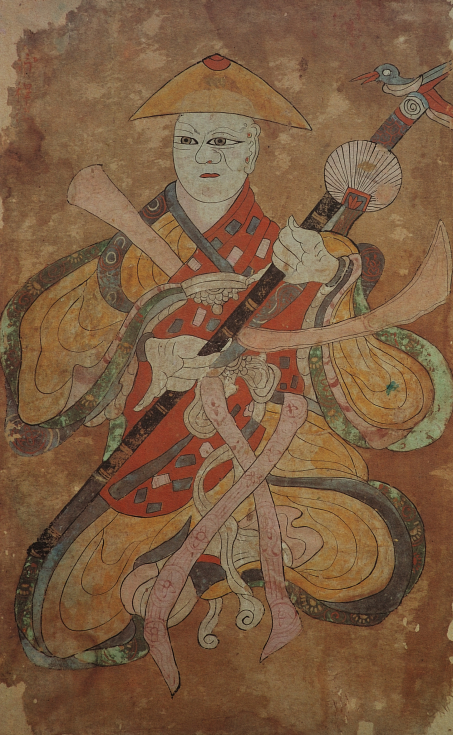
Painting of Jeseok for ritual use by shamans, possibly sixteenth century

The next day, Seji-aegi finds that her lover is eating quartz. She and the servant offer him a tableful of food instead, and he rapidly devours it all. When the two take the table out of the room, they find that all of the food has reappeared, uneaten. Seji-aegi then asks him about a dream she had that night, in which three pearls fell from heaven and into her clothes. The sage informs her that she is pregnant with triplet sons, and to name them Chegungsoe, Ilgungsoe, and Saenggyeongsoe. He then vanishes without a trace.

Seji-aegi is seven months pregnant when her family returns. Her mother sees her first and tells her husband that their daughter has a deadly illness for which the cure is to not see her father for three months, but her father makes his way to her room after only a month. When he realizes that she is pregnant, he decides to kill her. Seji-aegi persuades him to lock her in her room and to seal the door with iron, so that she may die while bringing the least dishonor to the family. The sage appears in the sealed room miraculously to supply her with air, water, food, and fire.

Several years later, Seji-aegi's mother convinces her husband to open the door, only to discover that Seji-aegi and her three sons are all safe and sound. The father realizes that his three grandsons make no shadow, and decides to keep them in the family. When they go to school at the age of ten, they are so intelligent that the teacher suspects that they are not human children and refuses to teach them further until they can tell him their father's name. When the triplets ask their mother about their parentage, she claims that they were born when she urinated on a tree. The triplets know that she is lying and threaten to kill themselves, at which point she reveals the truth.

The triplets journey to Geumgang Temple to meet their father, who gives them two tasks to verify their parentage. The first is to wash themselves with water while wearing paper clothes, and to not make any of the paper wet. The second is to build a great sand castle and run into it, and to not have a single grain of sand on their clothes. The triplets succeed in both tasks. The sage makes Seji-aegi the goddess of grain, and turns the triplets into the Jeseok gods who are in charge of fertility. He himself becomes a Buddha, ending the narrative.

== Interpretations ==
The Seng-gut story may contain the greatest narrative diversity out of all known Korean shamanic narratives. It combines a number of episodes which are individually attested in Korean folklore or mythology into a single shamanic narrative. The episodes involving Seokga have clear parallels to other Korean creation narratives, especially to the Changse-ga narrative recited in 1923 by the shaman Kim Ssang-dori, who was also from Hamhung. The Gangbangdek narrative is related to the central Korean variants of the Seongju-puri narrative, in which a human carpenter builds a palace for the gods and ultimately becomes the household god Seongju, as well as a Korean folktale of a castle-building contest between a brother and a sister. The premise of the temple bell narrative—the sacrifice of a human child to create a Buddhist temple bell—is also common in Korean folklore, most notably in the tale of the Emille Bell. The story of the rich man and his daughter-in-law is another very widespread Korean folktale and also has shamanic parallels in Sumyeong-jangja of the Cheonji-wang bon-puri of Jeju Island. Finally, the story featuring Seji-aegi is a typical northwestern Jeseok bon-puri narrative.

The central figure in all episodes is referred to as the "sage" (seoin). Park Jong-seong and Lee Chang-yoon both argue that all figures referred to as the "sage" are really a single deity, so that Seokga is also Gangbangdek and the sage of Geumgang Temple. This aligns better with other mainland Korean creation narratives, in which the father of the triplets is explicitly mentioned to be Seokga. Lee Joo-young argues that it is "difficult" to accept this premise, because Seokga's death and cremation and the birth of Ching'ae-dure's son are explicitly mentioned in the text. He does note that recurrent references to Geumgang Temple make it clear that Ching'ae-dure's son is indeed the priest of the Jeseok bon-puri.
