= Gawp =

Concept in Jeju Island shamanism

Gawp (Jeju: ᄀᆞᆸ) is a cosmological concept in Jeju Island shamanism referring to the divide between heaven and earth, humans and non-humans, and the living and the dead.

- In the Jeju creation myth, a gawp between heaven and earth is said to be created from the original mingled state of the universe. Later, the god Daebyeol-wang creates a gawp between humans and non-humans when he numbs the tongues of animals, plants, and rocks so that they can no longer speak, and physically separates the living from the dead.
- In the Buldo-maji, a series of rituals held for fertility gods, shamans (simbang) create a gawp between Saengbul-halmang, the goddess of childbirth and patron of young children, and Gusamseung-halmang, the goddess of dead children who send illnesses to kill babies and bring them under her dominion.
- In the Durin-gut, a ritual held to cure mental illnesses, shamans endeavor to create a gawp between the human patient and the malevolent dokkaebi that has entered their body and is responsible for the insanity.
