= Yi Chŏng =

Korean painter (1541–1622)

- Hangul: 이정
- Hanja: 李霆
- RR: I Jeong
- MR: I Chŏng

Art name
- Hangul: 탄은
- Hanja: 灘隱
- RR: Taneun
- MR: T'anŭn

Yi Chŏng (Korean: 이정; Hanja: 李霆; 1541–1622?) was a Korean painter, one of the most popular of his time. He was the great-great-grandson of Sejong the Great of Joseon.

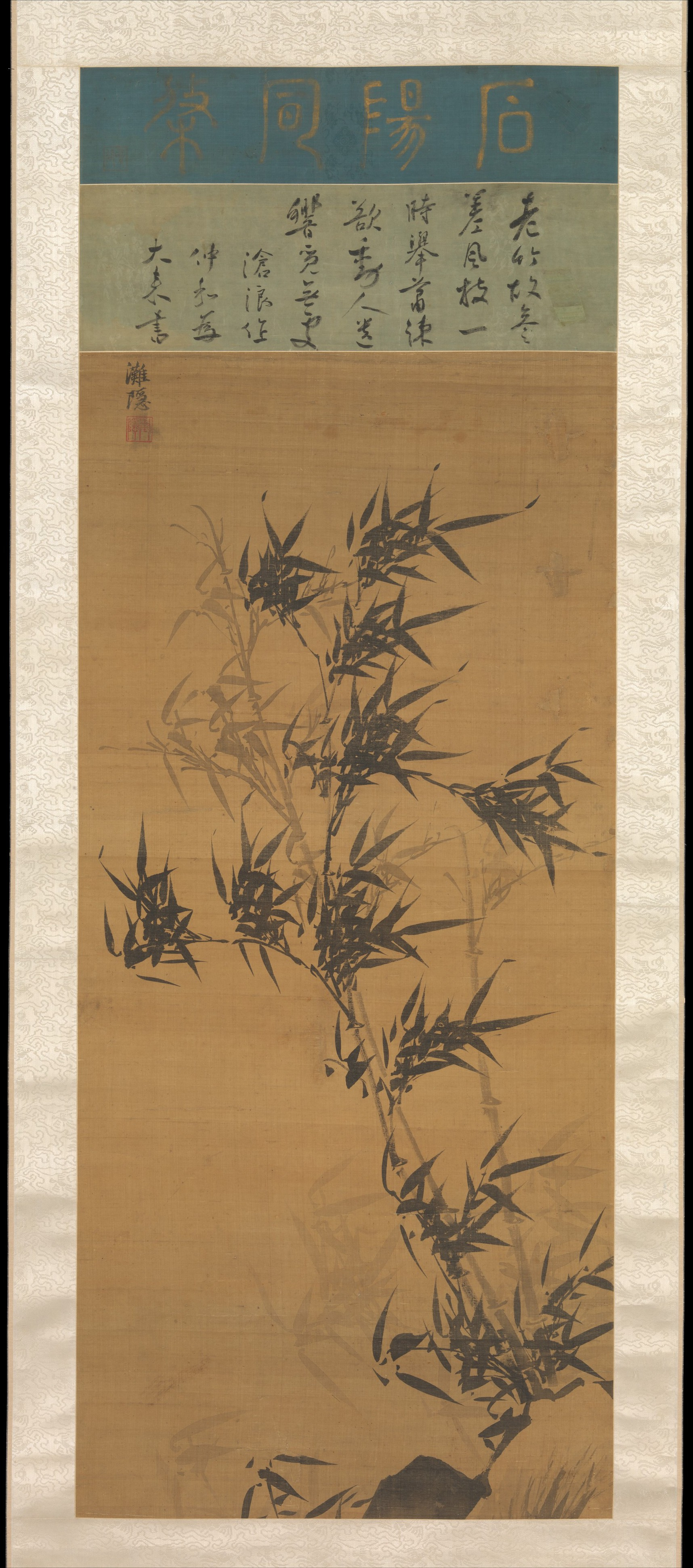
Bamboo in the Wind, 17th century
