= Gongsim =

Legendary Korean princess

- Goddess of Shaman
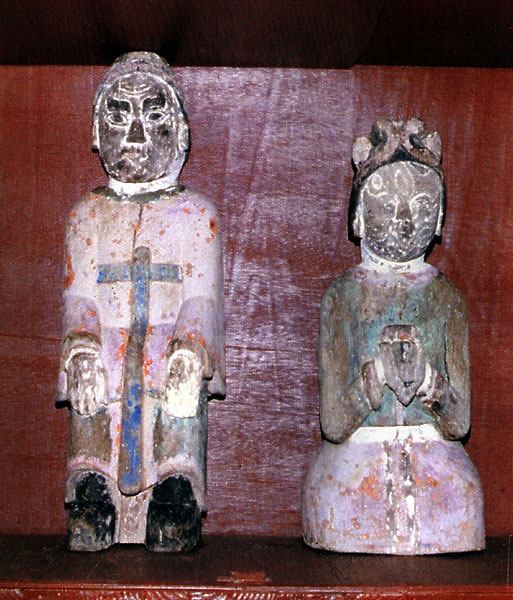
- Statues of Gongsim (right) and her beloved Jo Tong (left) at Okgwa, Gokseong County
- Other names

Korean name
- Hangul: 공심
- RR: Gongsim
- MR: Kongsim
- Venerated in: Korean shamanism
- Gender: Female
- Region: South Chungcheong, Jeolla, and South Gyeongsang
- Ethnic group: Koreans

Genealogy
- Dynasty: Goryeo

Gongsim (Korean: 공심) is a legendary Korean princess of the Goryeo dynasty said to have been struck with sinbyeong, an illness which can only be cured by initiation into shamanism. According to the myth, she joined the shamanic priesthood at Namsan Mountain in Seoul, and introduced the shamanic religion to Korea or to parts of Korea.

The myth of Gongsim was known only in the southwestern provinces of South Chungcheong, Jeolla, and South Gyeongsang, and oral transmission of the story appears to now have ended. While most of the six versions transcribed by researchers concur that Gongsim was a Goryeo princess-turned-shaman initiated at Namsan, the details diverge between them. In one version, the princess goes insane after the death of her beloved and must be cured by shamanic initiation. In another version, she is imprisoned by her father but teaches shamanism to her wardens, who spread the faith in Korea. Whether Gongsim is based on a historical noblewoman is unknown, although lack of corroboration in literary sources makes it highly unlikely that she had royal blood.

Southwestern Korean shamans invoke Gongsim at the start of many rituals, identifying the princess as "our monarch and ruler" or "our sovereign and ruler" and Namsan as the "origin". The invocation also includes a statement about the princess which usually superficially appears to refer to a Buddhist temple or to prostration, but whose true meaning is disputed. The invocation has since spread north to Seoul shamanism and—in a highly divergent and largely uninterpretable form—south to Jeju Island. In Seoul, the Gongsim invocation begins the recitation of the Princess Bari myth. In Jeju, it is associated with the Mengdu triplets, the local patron gods of shamanism.

== Mythology ==
Locations of Gongsim myth attestations

No shamanic narratives about Princess Gongsim (Note: Three etymologies of the name Gongsim have been proposed, all Sino-Korean: 公心 "justly minded", 功心 "meritoriously minded", and 空心 "śūnyatā-minded". All are pronounced Gongsim in Korean.) are known, but six versions of a southwestern Korean myth about the figure—all told outside a ritual context—have been transcribed by researchers. Five were collected in the 1930s by the Japanese sociologist Akiba Takashi, and one in the 1970s by the Korean scholar Kim Jeong-eop. Oral transmission of the myth appears to have ended as of 2013, although the brief Gongsim-related invocations recited by shamans during rituals continue. In the majority of versions, Gongsim is a princess of the Goryeo (918―1392) dynasty who is struck with sinbyeong, a disease that can only be cured by initiation into shamanism. She is initiated at Namsan, a mountain in Seoul, and spreads the shamanic religion in Korea. The three most detailed versions were transcribed from Okgwa (now part of Gokseong County), Jeonju, and Tongyeong.

In the Okgwa version, the Goryeo princess Gongsim falls madly in love with Jo Tong, a twelfth-century man from Okgwa whose existence is historically attested. Jo Tong, who is married, decides that he must leave the capital to avoid the princess and volunteers to serve as a commander on Korea's northern frontier. One day, he is ambushed by enemy forces. He loses his left hand in the ensuing defeat. He resigns his command in shame and returns to Okgwa, where he dies of his injury. Meanwhile, Gongsim, who has been waiting for her love to return south, goes insane when he fails to come back. Her father sends her to Namsan, where she is cured of her madness by being initiated into shamanism. She rides a horse which goes where it will, intending to teach shamanism to the people wherever the horse may lead her. The horse stops at Okgwa, where she discovers Jo Tong's grave. She lives by his grave, spreading the shamanic religion among the locals. The locals hold a symbolic wedding for the souls of the two after her death. As of the 1970s, Jo Tong and Gongsim were worshipped as village patron gods of Okgwa at the local Seonangdang shrine, where wooden statues of the two were installed. Locals also identified a certain grave as belonging to the princess, and believed that her name was invoked by local shamans because it was she who had founded the shamanic religion of Jeolla Province.

In the 1930s, the shamans of Jeonju worshipped a king named Hwangwangje and his daughter Gongsimheon. According to the local myth, the former imprisons his daughter in her own room when she is struck with sinbyeong. But her wardens themselves learn shamanic rituals from the princess to successfully cure illnesses and cast off misfortune, and the king eventually decides to release her. The wardens teach the rituals to other women, and the religion spreads to all Korea. The Tongyeong version has similar elements. The princess Gongsim goes insane, and her father expels her to Namsan, where she practices shamanism. She gives birth to two sons, who gives birth to four daughters each. The eight girls go to each of the Eight Provinces of Korea and disseminate shamanism there to help the locals.

The shorter versions are attested from Suncheon, Mokpo, and Gongju. The Suncheon myth also features Gongsim being stricken with sinbyeong and moving to Namsan, where she is initiated into shamanism by a Buddhist priest. This narrative explains the shamanic religion as a branch of Buddhism. In the Mokpo version, Gongsim does not experience sinbyeong but is instead a princess with supernatural powers of healing. Her father tests her by pretending to be ill. The daughter divines that the illness is false, but predicts that he will soon fall genuinely sick. When this happens, she cures her father through rituals at Namsan and becomes the first shaman. The Gongju myth is the shortest and most divergent, and does not mention Gongsim by name. According to this version, a certain Goryeo princess was a great devotee of Buddhism who shamans came to invoke during rituals, rather than being a shaman herself.

== Invocation ==
=== Seoul ===
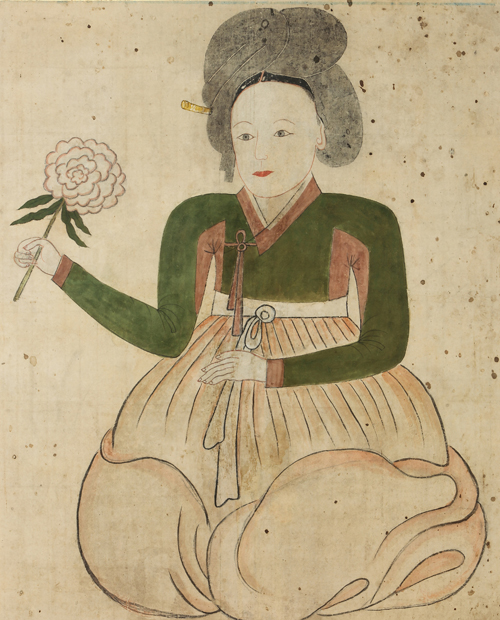
Portrait of the Princess Bari

In the shamanic tradition of Seoul—the current dominant form of the religion in South Korea—an invocation involving Gongsim is made only at the beginning of the narrative hymn of the Princess Bari, which tells a sacred myth about an abandoned princess who journeys to the afterlife and becomes the patron goddess of shamans. This invocation begins with a reference to the "country" (nara), continues by connecting Gongsim to the "Buddhist temple" (jeol/jeor (Note: Korean <l> takes the alternative form <r> when followed by a vowel.)), and concludes with the declaration that the "southwest" (namseo) is the "origin" (bon).

나라로 나라로 공심은 절이옵고, 절이 남서가 본이로소이다.

Nara-ro nara-ro Gongsim-eun jeor-iopgo, jeor-i namseo-ga bon-irosoida.

"To the country, to the country, Gongsim is the temple; and for the temple, the southwest is the origin."

This is often followed by a statement of location: the "South of the River" (Gangnam) is the "Great Han country" (Daehan-guk), while "this country" (i nara) or "East of the Sea" (Haedong) is Korea.

=== Southwestern Korea ===
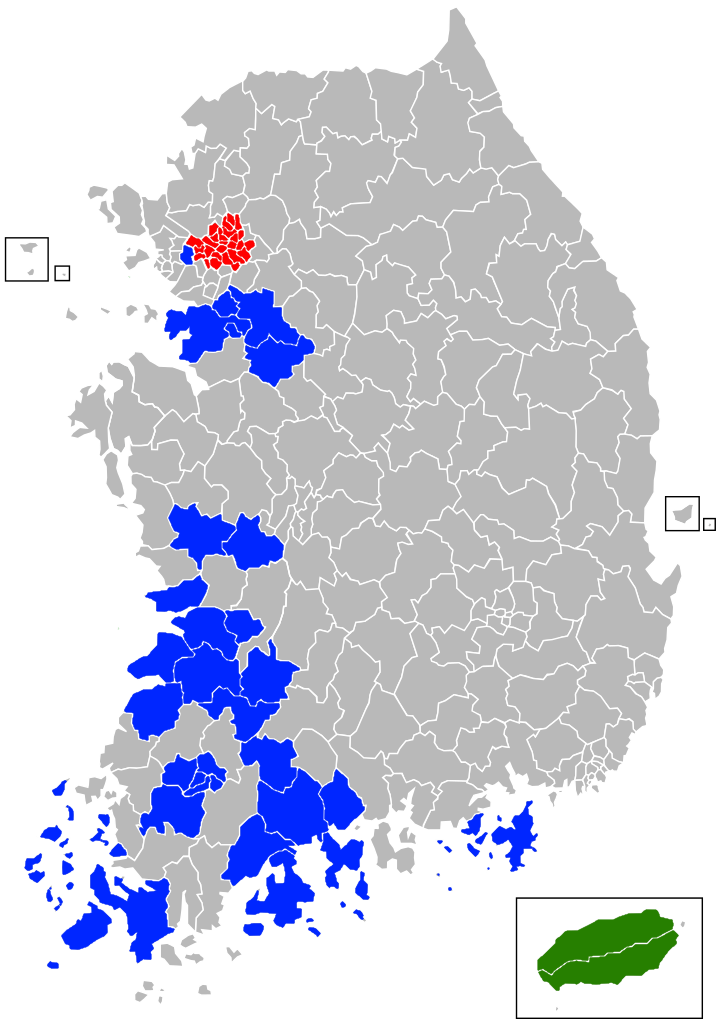
South Korean cities and counties in which researchers have transcribed Gongsim-related invocations. Seoul is in red, Jeju Island in green, and southwestern areas in blue.

Invocations to Gongsim are particularly widespread among the hereditary shamans of the southwestern provinces of southern Gyeonggi, Chungcheong, Jeolla, and southern South Gyeongsang. This is also the only region where legends about Gongsim have been transcribed. The shamanic practices of this area constitute a coherent cultural tradition not only in the popularity of Gongsim, but in the favored style of shamanic music as well. In this area, the invocation generally begins by referring to "our monarch and ruler" (awang imgeum) or "our sovereign and ruler" (ahwang imgeum), followed by either the statement that Gongsim "makes prostrations" (jeol-hajiyo) or that she "gives to the Buddhist temple" (jeor-e juyo). Namsan is then said to be the "origin" (bon). The following invocations, the first from Naju and the latter from Mokpo, are typical:

아왕 임금은 공심은 절허지요, 남산은 본이로다.

Awang imgeum-eun Gongsim-eun jeol-heojiyo, Namsan-eun bon-iroda.

"As for our monarch and ruler, Gongsim makes prostrations; Namsan is the origin."

아황 임금아 공심은 절에 주고, 남산은 본이구나.

Ahwang imgeum-a Gongsim-eun jeor-e jugo, Namsan-eun bon-iguna.

"O our sovereign and ruler! Gongsim gives to the temple; Namsan is the origin!"

In one version from Haenam, "our monarch and ruler" is replaced by "welcome of the gods" (yeongsin). In an important variant attested both in northern Gyeonggi and southeastern Tongyeong, the phrase "Gongsim makes prostrations" is replaced by the similar-sounding "Gongsim is the mistress of ceremonies" (Gongsim-eun jeryeju-yo) or "Gongsim is the mistress of ritual" (Gongsim-i jeju-yo).

The invocation is followed by a formulaic statement about Korean shamanic cosmology, generally explained with Buddhist terminology. The first major variant of this statement involves references to Korea or the lunisolar East Asian calendar, while the second variant lists various universes of Buddhist mythology. The following example of the former type is from Gochang.

아황 임금아 공심은 절의 주요, 남산은 본이로다. 조선은 국이요, 팔만은 사두연에 금년은 열에 두달 과년은 열에 석달 소월은 이십구일 대월은 설흔날요.

Ahwang imgeum-a Gongsim-eun jeor-ui juyo, Namsan-eun bon-iroda. Joseon-eun gug-iyo, palman-eun saduyeon-e geumnyeon-eun yeor-e du dal gwanyeon-eun yeor-e seok dal soweor-eun isip-gu il daeweor-eun seolheun nal-lyo.

"O our sovereign and ruler! Gongsim gives to the temple; Namsan is the origin. Korea is the country. Eighty thousand are the years of the Four Paths [to Buddhist enlightenment]. This year is ten and two months; last year was ten and three months. Short months are twenty-nine days; long months are thirty days."

The occasions believed to necessitate the Gongsim invocation vary greatly within the area, ranging from shamans who only sing it at the start of one specific ritual to those who recite it at the beginning of virtually every rite. But usually, the invocation is made at the start of the first or second component rite of a multi-component ceremony.

=== Jeju ===
A formal prayer called the Gongseon-gaseon is part of the Chogam-je, a ceremony in which the shaman invites the gods to the ritual ground, and which initiates most rituals in the shamanism of southern Jeju Island. This prayer occurs between the Bepo-doeop-chim, in which the shaman recites the Jeju creation myth, and the Nal-gwa-guk-seomgim, in which the shaman tells the gods the time and place of the ritual. The Gongseon-gaseon is usually sung to the beat of the janggu drum, although the mengdu bell is sometimes rung instead in minor ceremonies. The words of the prayer are fixed and their meaning is opaque and largely unknown to the shamans themselves. The entirety of the Gongseon-gaseon, as transcribed in a 1984 initiation ritual, is given below.

이~ 이~ 공선이라 공서는 공서는 가신 가신은 공서는 제주 남선 본입네다. 인부역 서가여레 서준낭 서준공서 말은 여쭙긴 전은 전광 절수퍼 드립네다.

I—i—Gonseon-ira Gongseo-neun Gongseo-neun gasin gasin-eun Gongseo-neun Jeju Namseon bon-imneda. Inbuyeok Seoga-yeore seojun-nang seojun-Gongseo mar-eun yeojjupgin jeon-eun jeon'gwang jeolsupeo deurimneda.

The Gongseon-gaseon is the Jeju variant of the Gongsim invocation of the mainland. There are no legends about Gongsim in Jeju, but the local context of the invocation is suggested in the Gobun-mengdu initiation ritual. In this ceremony, which takes the form of ritual theater, the Mengdu triplets—the patron gods of shamanism—confiscate a novice shaman's ritual implements as punishment for negligence. The novice shaman is able to win the favor of the triplets' mother, Noga-danpung-agissi, who sends her sons a letter ordering them to return the implements to the novice. The content of this letter is:

공신 ᄒᆞ고도 가신 ᄒᆞ고도, 제주 남산은 본은 인부역이라.

Gongsin hawgodo gasin hawgodo, Jeju Namsan-eun bon-eun inbuyeog-ira.

"Even while doing Gongsin, even while doing gasin, Inbuyeok is the origin of Namsan in Jeju."

The triplets (as played by senior shamans) debate what they should do about the letter, but ultimately return the implements while agreeing that they should send the letter to the human world so that human shamans can return it to their mother for them. The Gonseon-gaseon prayer therefore becomes a metaphorical letter that shamans are addressing to the goddess Noga-danpung-agissi at the start of every ritual.

The word gongsi, used to refer to the mengdu ancestors (the souls of deceased shamans who are the source of Jeju shamans' ritual authority) in the Gongsi-puri ritual, may also be connected to the mainland figure Gongsim.

== Interpretations ==
Southwestern Korea and Jeolla Province in particular are the source of the Gongsim myth. The Seoul and Jeju invocations referencing Gongsim or Gongseon reflect later southwestern influence. Both Seoul and Jeju have their own mythological histories of the origins of shamanism. Princess Bari is both the ancestral shaman and the patron goddess of shamans in Seoul religion, while the Mengdu triplets are similarly honored in Jeju Island. By contrast, Jeolla shamanic traditions do not have a clear ancestral figure other than Gongsim, as Princess Bari there is considered a death goddess or as not being a deity at all.

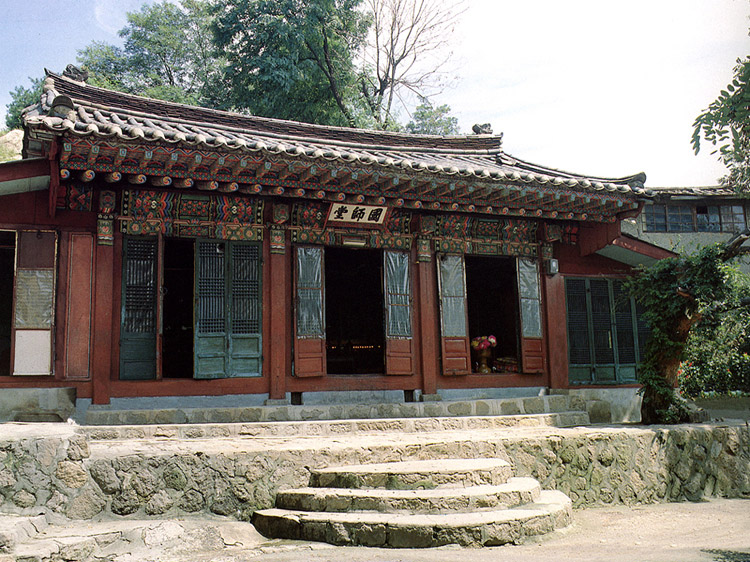
Guksa-dang shrine, in its current location at Mount Inwang

The invocation honors Gongsim as the symbolic queen and ruler of shamans, and affirms the religion's historical legitimacy. The association of the first shaman with royal blood seeks to increase the religion's social prestige, for much the same reason that Princess Bari—another shamanic founder—is also a king's daughter. The peak of Namsan that the princess is connected to was the original seat of Guksa-dang, the most important shamanic temple in the city of Seoul and a major center of religious devotion. (Note: Guksa-dang was removed to its current location at nearby Mount Inwangsan in 1925 when the Japanese colonial government built the State Shinto Chōsen Shrine on the peak.) The place name Namsan "South Mountain" may also suggest a contrast with Bei Mangshan (lit. 'Northern Mount Mang'), a peak full of cemeteries north of the Chinese capital of Luoyang which has become an East Asian metonymy for death, and thus imply an association between shamanism and the forces of life.

The meaning of the phrase associated with Gongsim in the invocation, such as jeor-e juyo, is disputed. In Modern Korean, jeol/jeor is a homophone for both "Buddhist temple" and "prostration." It is generally recognized that the "Buddhist temple" interpretation does not make sense in the context of the Gongsim myth or shamanic ritual. The phrase may instead refer to prostration as a form of shamanic devotional act, with the versions suggesting "Buddhist temple" meaning being corruptions. Im Ni-na argues that jeol/jeor is itself a corruption of the original form jeryeju "mistress of ritual", attested in some versions. If this interpretation is correct, the invocation would be emphasizing Gongsim's role as the originator of shamanic ceremonies. Kim Jeong-eop proposes a Middle Korean etymology as a combination of the noun cel "vanquishing a demon" and the verb cita "to rely upon", (Note: Both forms given in Yale Romanization of Korean, the standard for Middle Korean transliterations; jeol and jida in standard Modern Korean Revised Romanization.) with the meaning "[We] rely upon Gongsim who vanquishes demons."

Whether Gongsim is based on a historical individual is unknown. But Jo Tong, the object of her unrequited love in the Okgwa myth, was a historical minister of the Goryeo court who served in the late twelfth century and was once held captive by the northern Jurchen Jin dynasty for three years. The social status of shamanism was relatively high under the Goryeo, and there are attested cases of Goryeo noblewomen becoming shamans. Kim Jeong-eop speculates that Gongsim may have been a historical noblewoman who was romantically involved with Jo Tong before his capture by the Jurchens, and who was then initiated into shamanism and spread the religion in Jeolla. It is very unlikely that she was actually of royal blood, however, as no relevant figure exists in the Goryeo histories.
