= Chogong bon-puri =

Korean shamanic narrative of Jeju Island

In Korean shamanism, the Chogong bon-puri (Korean: 초공본풀이) is a shamanic narrative whose recitation forms the tenth ritual of the Great Gut, the most sacred sequence of rituals in Jeju shamanism. The Chogong bon-puri is the origin myth of Jeju shamanic religion as a whole, to the point that shamans honor the myth as the "root of the gods" and respond that "it was done that way in the Chogong bon-puri" when asked about the origin of a certain ritual. It also explains the origin of the mengdu, the sacred metal objects that are the source of a Jeju shaman's authority. As with most works of oral literature, multiple versions of the narrative exist. The summary given below is based on the version recited by the high-ranking shaman An Sa-in (1912–1990).

== Description ==
Jimjin'guk and Imjeong'guk, a rich couple, are nearing fifty but still have no children. A Buddhist priest visits from the Hwanggeum Temple (Note: 황금 hwanggeum is generally considered a corruption of the archaic Middle Korean phrase han kem (한 ᄀᆞᆷ) "the Great God", and the priest would thus originally have been an indigenous Korean god and not a Buddhist priest.) and tells them to make offerings in his temple for a hundred days. They do so, and a girl is miraculously born. They name her Noga-danpung-agissi. When the girl is fifteen, both of her parents leave temporarily. They imprison her behind two doors with seventy-eight and forty-eight locks each and tell the family servant to feed her through a hole, so that she cannot leave the house while they are absent.

The Buddhist priest of the Hwanggeum Temple learns of the great beauty of Noga-danpung-agissi and visits the house to ask for alms. When the girl points out that she cannot leave the house, the priest takes out a bell and rings it three times, which breaks every lock. When she comes out wearing a veil of chastity, he strokes her head three times and leaves. Noga-danpung-agissi then becomes pregnant. When her parents return, they decide to kill her to restore the family's honor. When the family servant insists that she be killed instead, the parents relent and decide to expel both instead. Her father gives Noga-danpung-agissi a golden fan as she leaves.

The two decide to go to the Hwanggeum Temple, encountering various obstacles and crossing many strange bridges on the way. The servant explains the etymology of the bridges, connecting each name to the process of Noga-danpung-agissi's expulsion from the family. They eventually reach the temple and meet the priest, who banishes her to the land of the goddess of childbirth. Alone there, she gives birth to triplets who tear out of her two armpits and her breasts. (Note: The eldest is born from the right armpit on the eighth day of the ninth lunisolar month; the middle, from the left armpit on the eighteenth day of the same month; the youngest, from her breasts on the twenty-eighth day.) Having bathed them in a brass tub, she names the three boys Sin-mengdu, Bon-mengdu, and Sara-salchuk Sam-mengdu.

The family lives an impoverished life. At the age of eight, the three brothers become manservants of three thousand corrupt aristocrats who are preparing for the civil service examinations. Seven years later, the aristocrats go to Seoul to pass the examinations and take the triplets with them. The aristocrats leave the triplets stranded atop a pear tree on the way, but they are rescued by a local nobleman who is forewarned by a dream of dragons ensnared on the tree. They reach Seoul and are the only people to pass the examinations. Outraged, the aristocrats imprison Noga-danpung-agissi in the "palace of Indra of the three thousand heavens." This is generally understood as a metaphor for the aristocrats killing her, with other versions explicitly mentioning a murder.

The triplets visit their father, who makes them abandon their old lives and become shamans in order to save their mother. He asks his sons what they saw first when they came to the temple, and they respond that they saw heaven, earth, and the gate. The priest accordingly gives them the first cheonmun, or divination discs, with the Chinese characters 天 "heaven", 地 "earth", and 門 "gate" inscribed. The triplets hold the first shamanic rituals as their father has ordered them to do, aided by Neosameneo-doryeong, the young god of shamanic music. The rituals successfully resurrect their mother. The triplets then summon a master smith from the East Sea to forge the first mengdu implements. In some versions, this smith's mengdu are unsound, and the triplets' father summons a celestial smith named Jeon'gyeongnok to forge good-quality mengdu. In any case, the triplets store them in a palace where their mother and Neosameneo-doryeong will keep watch over them. They then ascend into the afterlife to become divine judges of the dead, wielding the sacred shamanic knives that they will use to bring justice to the aristocrats.

Some time later, the daughter of a state councillor falls seriously ill every ten years: at the age of seven, seventeen, twenty-seven and so forth. At the age of seventy-seven, she realizes that she is sick with sinbyeong, a disease sent down by the gods and cured only by initiation into shamanism. However, there are no ritual devices that she can use. She goes to the palace where the ritual implements are kept and prays to the triplets, who give her the sacred objects necessary for the shamanic initiation rite. The councilor's daughter is the first truly human shaman, and her receiving the ritual objects represents the first generational transfer of shamanic knowledge.
