= Mengdu =

Set of ritual devices, such as knives, a bell and divination implements

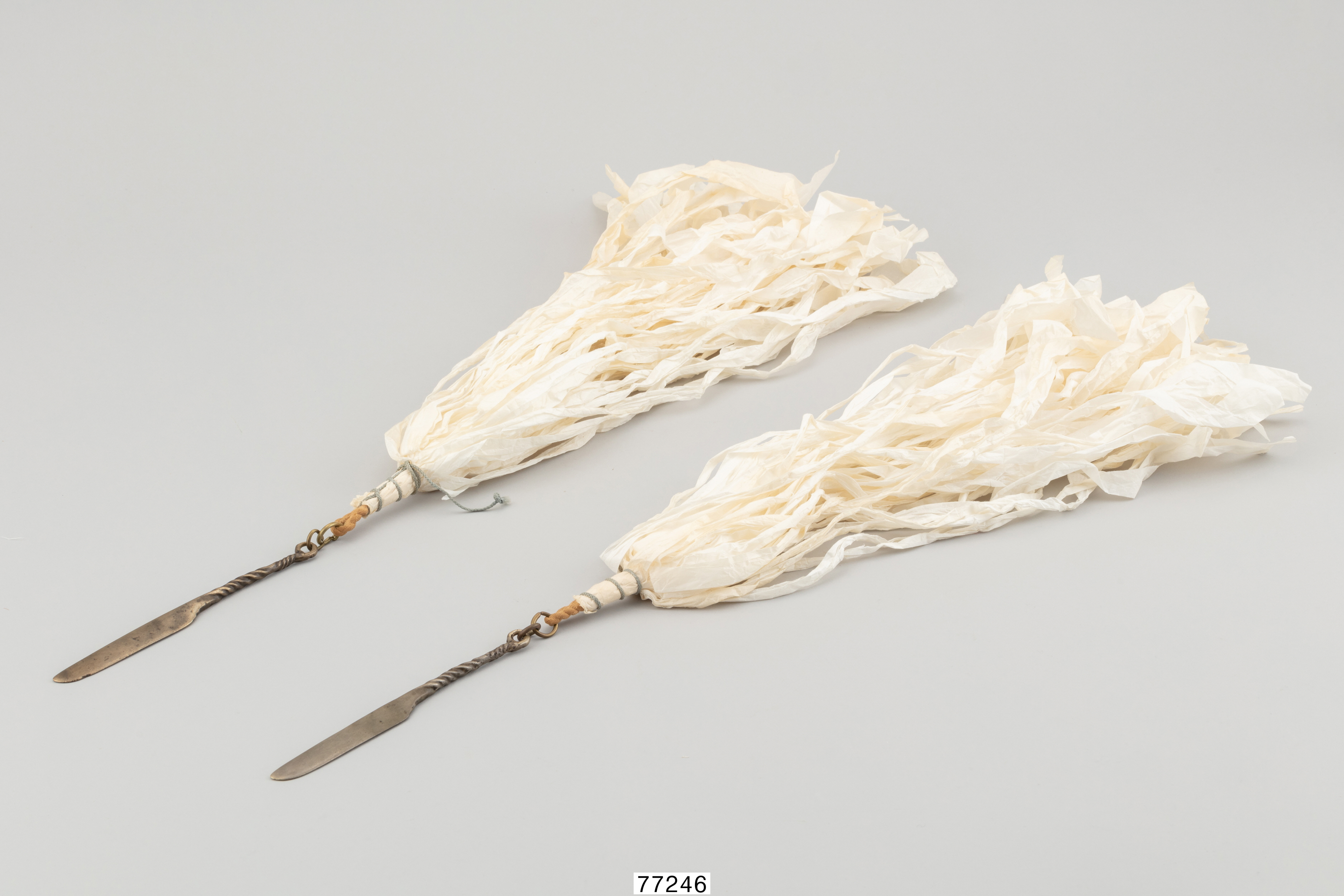
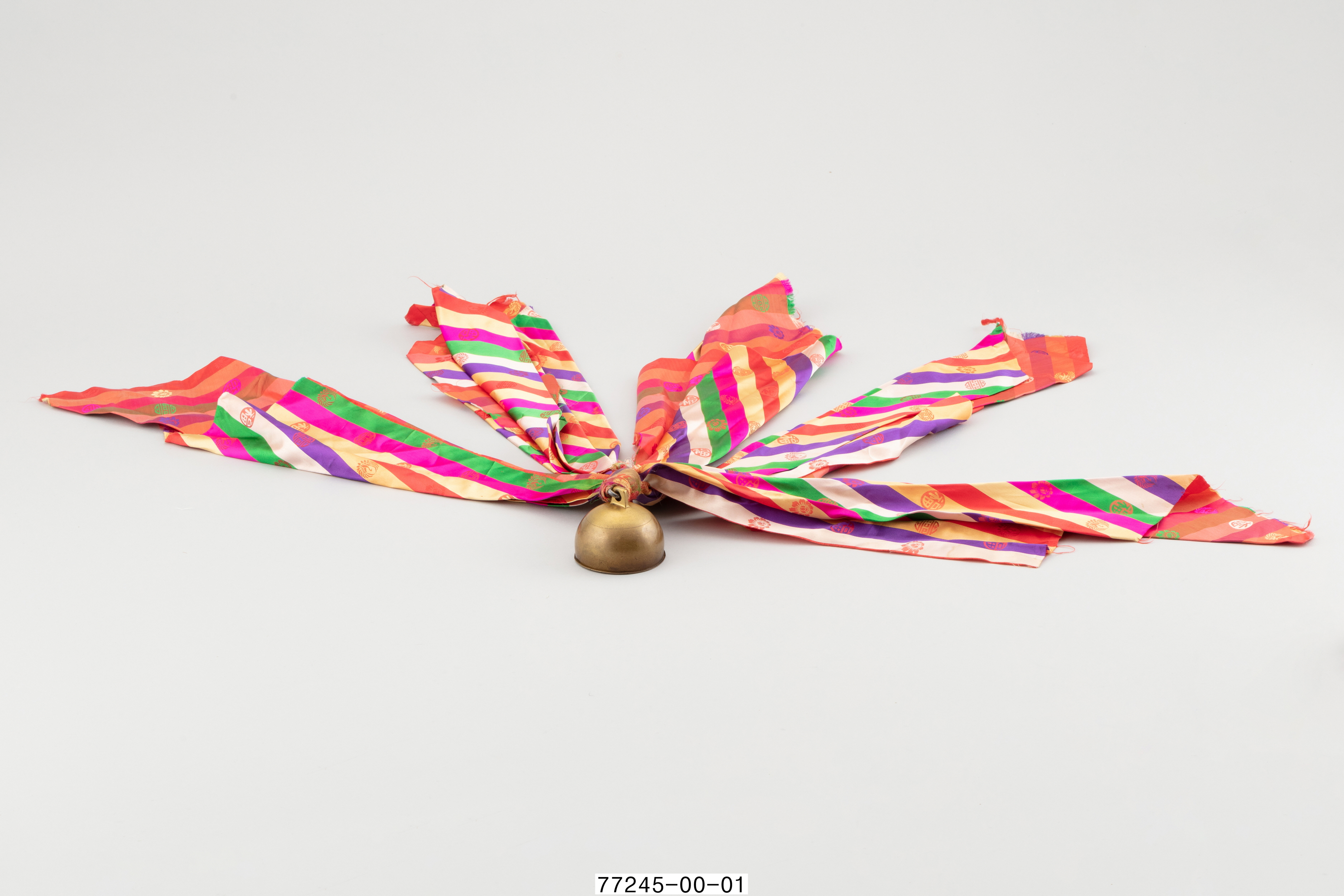
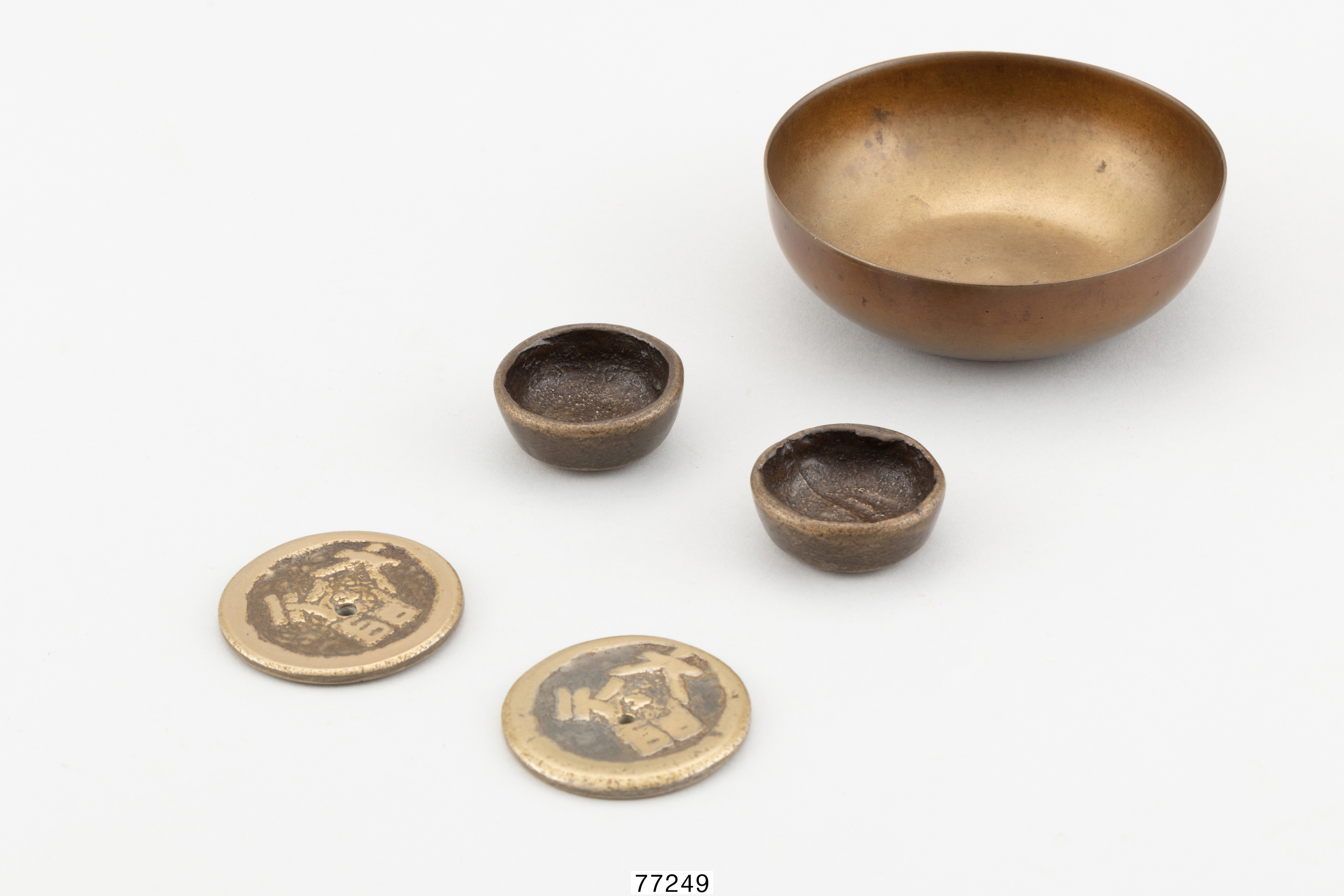
Three mengdu of the sun and moon

The mengdu (Jeju and Korean: 멩두), also called the three mengdu (삼멩두; sammengdu) and the three mengdu of the sun and moon (일월삼멩두; irwol sammengdu), are a set of three kinds of brass ritual devices—a pair of knives, a bell, and divination implements—which are the symbols of shamanic priesthood in the Korean shamanism of southern Jeju Island. Although similar ritual devices are found in mainland Korea, the religious reverence accorded to the mengdu is unique to Jeju.

The origin myth of the mengdu is found in the Chogong bon-puri, a major shamanic narrative in Jeju religion. According to this narrative, the original mengdu were possessed by the eponymous Mengdu triplets, the three deities who were the first to practice shamanic ritual on earth. The stylistic features of mengdu refer back to important events in the miraculous conception and lives of these gods. The implements play a critical role in ritual; both the knives and the divination implements are used to divine the will of the gods, and the bell is used to invite them into the ritual ground.

Every set of mengdu is believed to incarnate the spirits both of the heroes of the Chogong bon-puri, and of the historical human shamans who previously owned the particular set. These spirits are called the "mengdu ancestors", and are thought to intervene during rituals to help the current holder accurately ascertain the will of the gods. The mengdu are conventionally passed down from one generation to another, with the previous holder becoming the newest mengdu ancestor. The implements and the ancestors that embody them are the objects of regular worship and also feature prominently in the initiation rituals of Jeju shamanism.

Traditional Jeju religion is nowadays in decline, and there is currently a glut of mengdu sets within the traditional priesthood. At the same time, many ritual practitioners who are not trained and initiated in the traditional manner are now making their own mengdu.

== Origin myth ==
The mengdu are closely associated with the Chogong bon-puri, a shamanic narrative whose recitation forms the tenth ritual of the Great Gut, the most sacred sequence of rituals in Jeju shamanism. The Chogong bon-puri is the origin myth of Jeju shamanic religion as a whole, to the point that shamans honor the myth as the "root of the gods" and respond that "it was done that way in the Chogong bon-puri" when asked about the origin of a certain ritual. It is therefore to be expected that objects as important as the mengdu should be explained by it. As with most works of oral literature, multiple versions of the narrative exist. The summary given below is based on the version recited by the high-ranking shaman An Sa-in (1912–1990) with a focus on the details relevant to the mengdu.

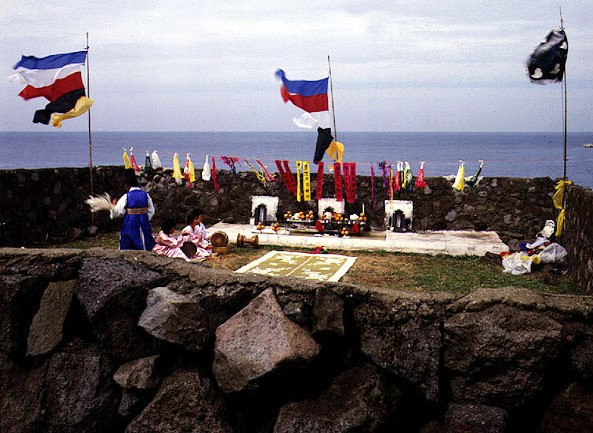
Shamanic ritual in Jeju Island. The modern rituals are said to be the same as the ones the triplets performed to resurrect Noga-danpung-agassi in the Chogong bon-puri.

Jimjin'guk and Imjeong'guk, a rich couple, are nearing fifty but still have no children. A Buddhist priest visits from the Hwanggeum Temple (Note: 황금 hwanggeum is generally considered a corruption of the archaic Middle Korean phrase han kem (한 ᄀᆞᆷ) "the Great God", and the priest would thus originally have been an indigenous Korean god and not a Buddhist priest.) and tells them to make offerings in his temple for a hundred days. They do so, and a girl is miraculously born. They name her Noga-danpung-agissi. When the girl is fifteen, both of her parents leave temporarily. They imprison her behind two doors with seventy-eight and forty-eight locks each and tell the family servant to feed her through a hole, so that she cannot leave the house while they are absent.

The Buddhist priest of the Hwanggeum Temple learns of the great beauty of Noga-danpung-agissi and visits the house to ask for alms. When the girl points out that she cannot leave the house, the priest takes out a bell and rings it three times, which breaks every lock. When she comes out wearing a veil of chastity, he strokes her head three times and leaves. Noga-danpung-agissi then becomes pregnant. When her parents return, they decide to kill her to restore the family's honor. When the family servant insists that she be killed instead, the parents relent and decide to expel both instead. Her father gives Noga-danpung-agissi a golden fan as she leaves.

The two decide to go to the Hwanggeum Temple, encountering various obstacles and crossing many strange bridges on the way. The servant explains the etymology of the bridges, connecting each name to the process of Noga-danpung-agissi's expulsion from the family. They eventually reach the temple and meet the priest, who banishes her to the land of the goddess of childbirth. Alone there, she gives birth to triplets who tear out of her two armpits and her breasts. (Note: The eldest is born from the right armpit on the eighth day of the ninth lunisolar month; the middle, from the left armpit on the eighteenth day of the same month; the youngest, from her breasts on the twenty-eighth day.) Having bathed them in a brass tub, she names the three boys Sin-mengdu, Bon-mengdu, and Sara-salchuk Sam-mengdu.

The family lives an impoverished life. At the age of eight, the three brothers become manservants of three thousand evil-minded Confucian scholars who are preparing for the civil service examinations. Seven years later, the Confucian scholars go to Seoul to pass the examinations and take the triplets with them. The scholars leave the triplets stranded atop a pear tree on the way, but they are rescued by a local nobleman who is forewarned by a dream of dragons ensnared on the tree. They reach Seoul and are the only people to pass the examinations. Outraged, the scholars imprison Noga-danpung-agissi in the "palace of Indra of the three thousand heavens". This is generally understood as a metaphor for the scholars killing her, with other versions explicitly mentioning a murder.

The triplets visit their father, who makes them abandon their old lives and become shamans in order to save their mother. He asks his sons what they saw first when they came to the temple, and they respond that they saw heaven, earth, and the gate. The priest accordingly gives them the first cheonmun, or divination discs, with the Chinese characters 天 "heaven", 地 "earth", and 門 "gate" inscribed. The triplets hold the first shamanic rituals as their father has ordered them to do, aided by Neosameneo-doryeong, the young god of shamanic music. The rituals successfully resurrect their mother. The triplets then summon a master smith from the East Sea to forge the first mengdu implements. In some versions, this smith's mengdu are unsound, and the triplets' father summons a celestial smith named Jeon'gyeongnok to forge good-quality mengdu. In any case, the triplets store them in a palace where their mother and Neosameneo-doryeong will keep watch over them. They then ascend into the afterlife to become divine judges of the dead, wielding the sacred shamanic knives that they will use to bring justice to the scholars.

Some time later, the daughter of a state councillor falls seriously ill every ten years: at the age of seven, seventeen, twenty-seven and so forth. At the age of seventy-seven, she realizes that she is sick with sinbyeong, a disease sent down by the gods and cured only by initiation into shamanism. However, there are no ritual devices that she can use. She goes to the palace where the ritual implements are kept and prays to the triplets, who give her the sacred objects necessary for the shamanic initiation rite. The councilor's daughter is the first truly human shaman, and her receiving the ritual objects represents the first generational transfer of shamanic knowledge.

== Physical description and ritual use ==
Jeju shamans refer to three types of ritual instruments made of brass—knives, a bell, and divination implements—as the mengdu, referring back to the recurrent element in the triplets' names.

=== Knives ===
Jeju shamans carry a pair of sacred knives, fashioned after the knives that the triplets take when they ascend to heaven to punish the Confucian scholars. Shamans refer to the knives as sin-kal seonsaeng Siwang daebeonji, literally "godly knife the master, daebeonji of the Siwang". The Siwang are the divine judges of the dead that the triplets become, but the meaning of daebeonji is unclear. The knives are among the most important ritual items of Jeju shamanism, and folklorist Kim Heonsun notes that "Jeju shamans' faith in the knives is nearly absolute."

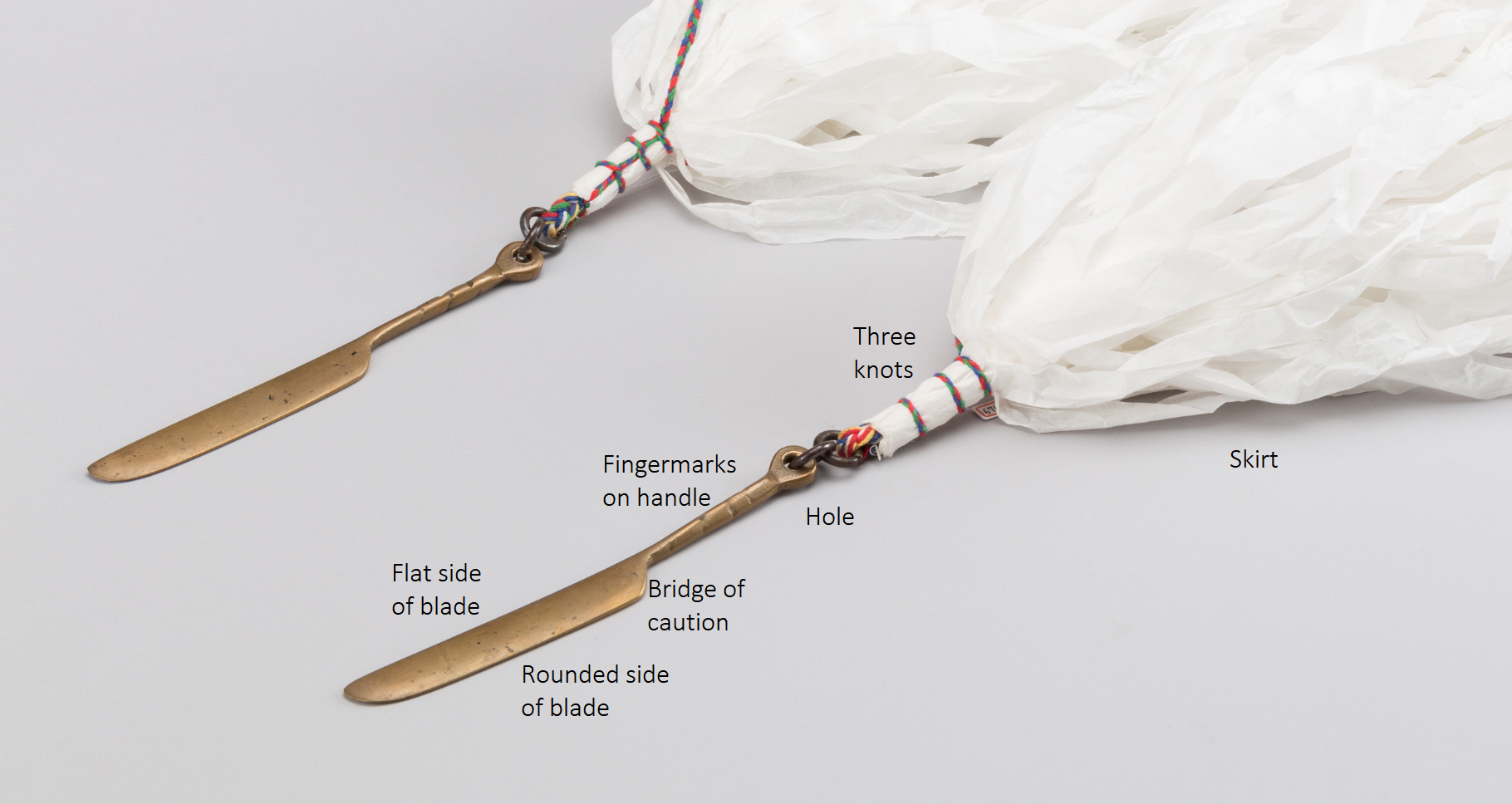
Sacred knives belonging to shaman Yi Jung-chun, with labels

The knife has two major parts: the brass knife itself, consisting of a blade (11–13 cm (4.3–5.1 in) long, 1.5–2 cm (0.59–0.79 in) wide) and a handle (9–10 cm (3.5–3.9 in) long); and the "skirt" (chima) of the knife, consisting of strands (55–60 cm (22–24 in) long) cut from usually eight but sometimes twelve pages of Korean paper, which are connected to the end of the handle by a string with three knots. Every part of the knife is interpreted by reference to the Chogong bon-puri myth, although shamans disagree on the details of the interpretations. The blade is shaped with one flat and one rounded side, representing the flat back and rounded belly of the pregnant Noga-danpung-agissi. Serpentine patterns are often etched on the blade, but what these symbolize are disputed by shamans, ranging from the dragons that the nobleman sees in his dream to a snake that the triplets encounter while serving the scholars. The part of the blade which tapers to meet the handle is called the "bridge of caution" (josim-dari) and stands for the difficult roads by which the girl and her servant cautiously make their way to the Hwanggeum Temple. The spiral marks on the handle symbolize the fingermarks that Noga-danpung-agissi leaves on her wrists after wringing them, either out of despair at her imprisonment or out of panic once she realizes she is pregnant. The hole in the handle represents the hole by which the imprisoned girl is fed, and the three knots on the string tied to it are the triplets themselves. The skirt is either Noga-danpung-agissi's skirt, or the veil that she wears while meeting the priest. There are sometimes six strands of string beneath the paper skirt. These stand for the Mengdu triplets and Neosame-neodoryeong, who in some versions appear as triplets and not a single god.

There is rarely a reason to replace the brass blade and handle, but the paper skirt requires regular replacement. In the case of eight-page skirts, five pages' worth of paper is replaced at the beginning of every new ritual. The strands remaining from the previous ceremony are called the underskirt (sok-chima), and the new strands are called the outer skirt (geot-chima). Strands may be replaced in the middle of a ceremony as well if they have become too ragged. Discarded strands are ritually burned by an apprentice shaman.

==== Ritual uses ====
The most important function of the knives is to divine the will of the gods. The shaman regularly throws the knives onto the ground during rituals, and the gods are believed to communicate through their relative position. There are six possible positions that the knives can take; these are referred to as "bridges". In the Chogong bon-puri narrative, Noga-danpung-agissi crosses physical bridges with the same names.

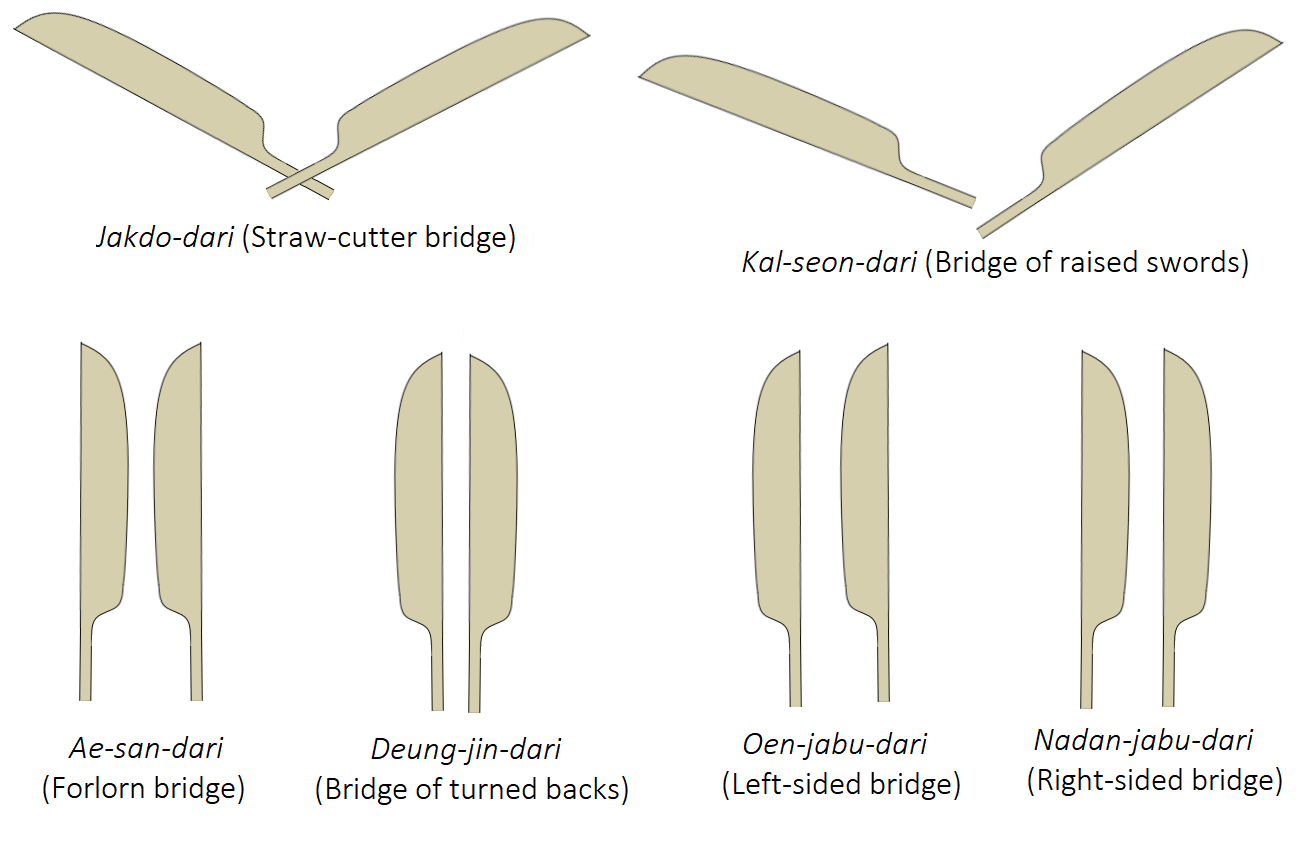
Diagram of Jeju knife divination

The two most inauspicious configurations are jakdo-dari, the straw-cutter's bridge, and kal-seon-dari, the bridge of the raised swords. In both, the rounded side of the blade falls outward. Jakdo-dari is when the knives are crossed, and kal-seon-dari is when they do not. The former symbolizes Noga-danpung-agissi's parents' initial decision to kill her with a straw-cutting machine, and is believed to presage unpreventable misfortune. The latter represents her parents' decision to stab her with swords instead, and means that misfortune is impending but may be forestalled with the correct rituals for the gods.

The rounded sides facing each other is termed ae-san-dari, the forlorn bridge. It symbolizes Noga-danpung-agissi facing her parents as they see each other for the final time, and signifies a sad event in the future. When the rounded sides face away, the resulting configuration is deung-jin-dari, the bridge of turned backs, showing the daughter and her parents turning their backs to each other. It portends a departure or discord. When either position appears when the shaman is inviting the gods into the human world, it means that the gods are unwilling to descend. When they appear when the shaman is sending the gods back to their abode, they are taken as an auspicious sign meaning that the gods are willing to leave.

Oen-jabu-dari, the position in which both rounded sides face left, is a positive sign that the gods were originally not planning to grant blessings, but have decided otherwise due to sympathy for the worshippers upon attending the ritual. It is the symbol of Noga-danpung-agissi's father giving his daughter a golden fan. The final position of nadan-jabu-dari, in which both rounded sides face right, is highly propitious. However, both configurations are considered unwelcome when the shaman is sending the gods back, as it suggests that the gods are unwilling to leave.

Shamans also employ knives for a number of other ritual purposes, including in ceremonial dances, to expel demons of pestilence in healing rituals, to cut out parts of sacrificial offerings for the gods, and while physically reenacting shamanic narratives.

=== Bell ===
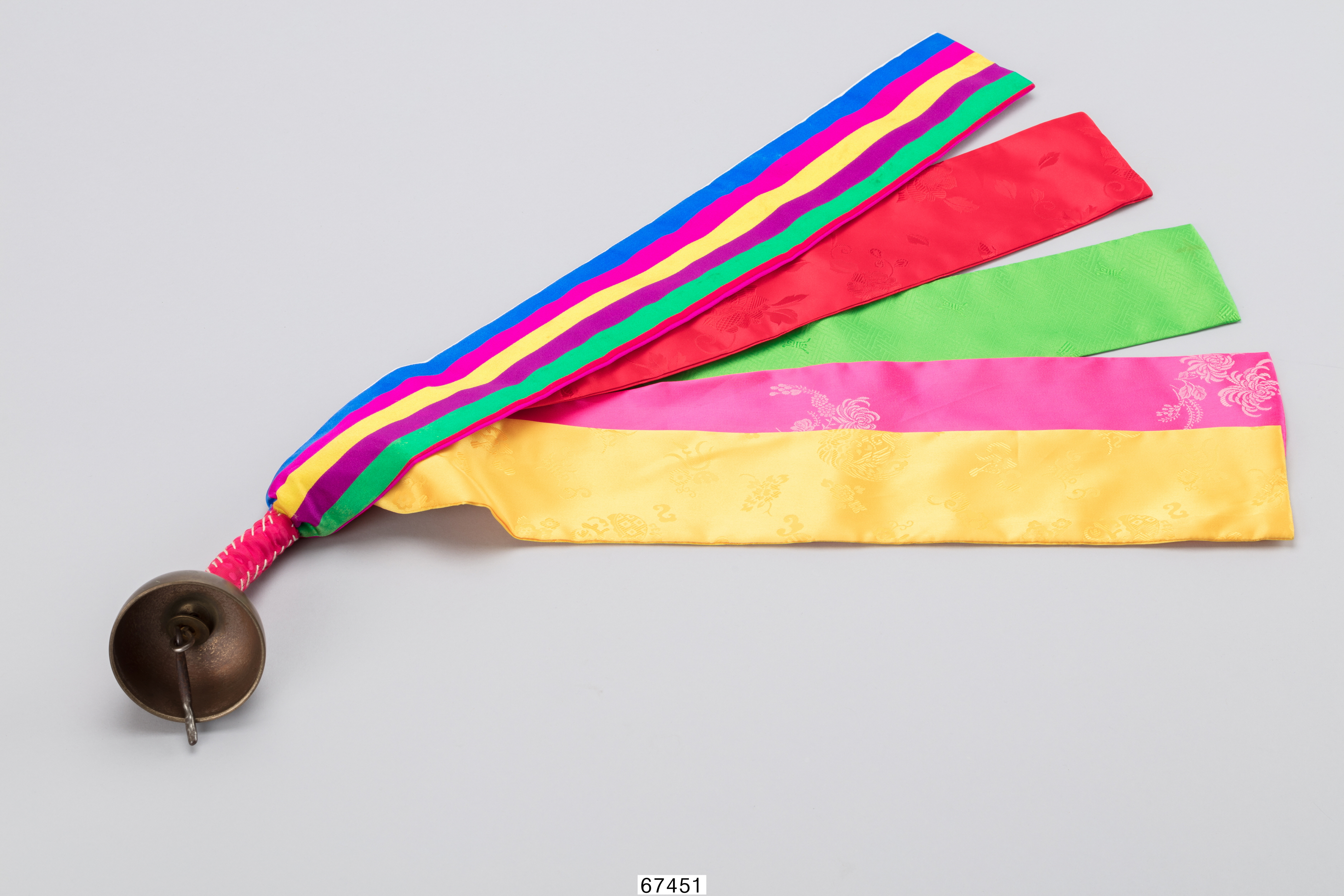
Bell belonging to shaman Yi Jung-chun

The sacred brass bell stands for the bell that the priest uses to open the locks on Noga-danpung-agissi's doors. It is referred to as yoryeong seonsaeng heunggeul-jeodae, "bell the master that is shaken". Like the knives, it has two major parts. The bell proper is 5–6 cm (2.0–2.4 in) high and 6–7 cm (2.4–2.8 in) wide at the mouth, with a clapper inside. The "skirt" consists of five to seven rolls (55–65 cm (22–26 in) long) of multicolored cloth—often red, green, and blue—which the shaman holds while ringing the bell.

The bell is rung when opening the gates of the gods' abode and inviting the gods to the ritual ground, reflecting its role in the myth as an opener of locks. The shaman also rings their bell while dancing, during the malmi (prayer recitation) for certain rituals, and while chanting certain shamanic narratives, including the Menggam bon-puri and any ancestral bon-puri. It is sometimes hung on the keun-dae, the bamboo pole by which the gods are believed to descend into the human world.

=== Divination implements ===
The divinatory implements consist of five objects made of brass: a pair of sangjan cups, a pair of cheonmun discs, and the sandae vessel. Some versions of the Chogong bon-puri state that the sangjan and cheonmun used by the triplets were wood, not brass, but that they fashioned brass models of the originals so that they could be used by future shamans.

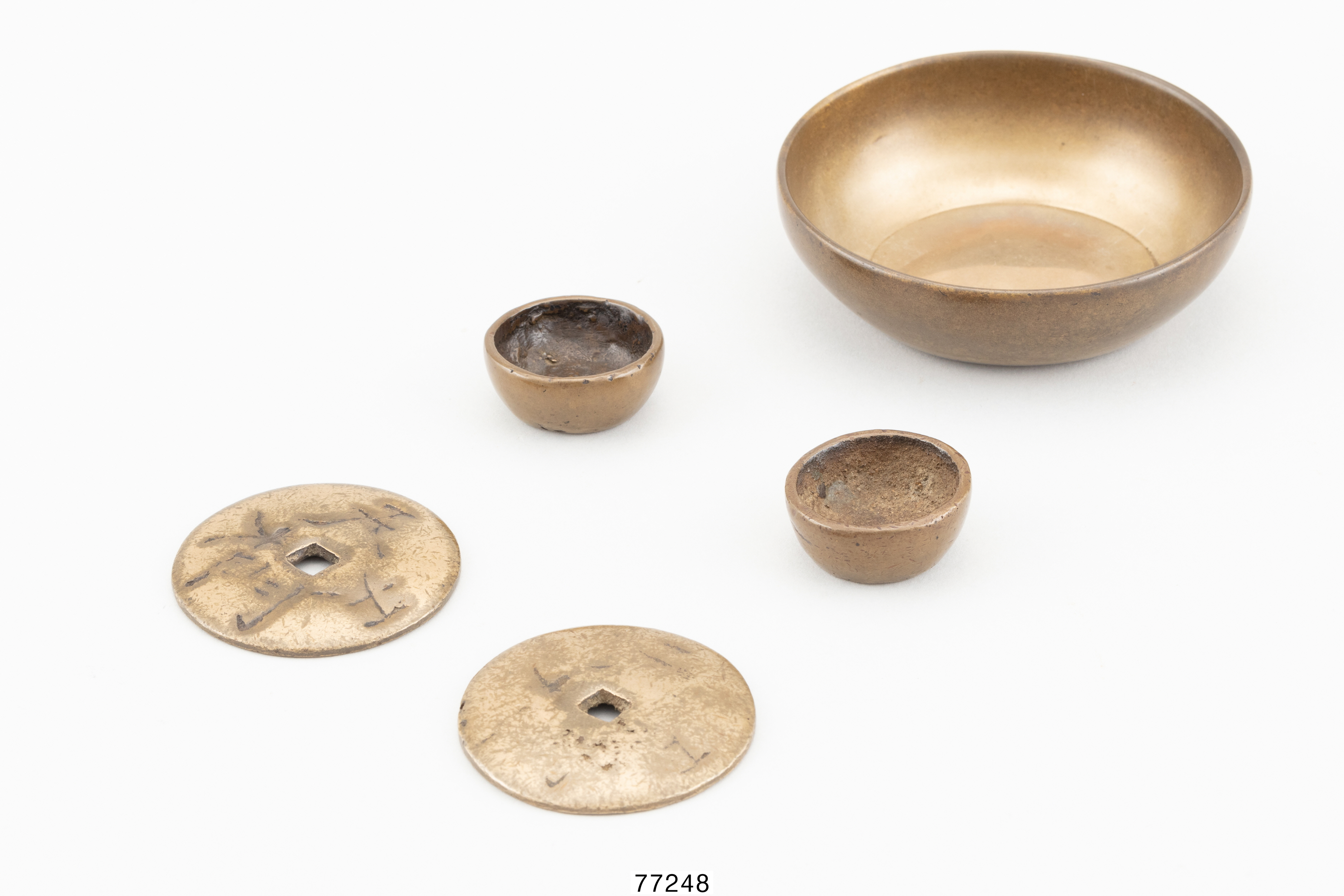
A set of divination implements belonging to shaman Hong Su-il. From left to right: cheonmun, sangjan, sandae. The characters inscribed on the cheonmun are 天 門 大 天 cheon mun dae cheon "heaven gate great heaven".

The sangjan (Sino-Korean 算盞 "divinatory cup") is an unadorned brass cup, 4–5 cm (1.6–2.0 in) wide at the mouth and 1–2 cm (0.39–0.79 in) tall. It represents the brass tub in which Noga-danpung-agissi bathed the triplets as newborns, and therefore symbolizes the maternal and feminine element.

The cheonmun (Sino-Korean 天文 "heavenly cash" or 天門 "heavenly gate") is a brass disc resembling a cash coin, 5–6 cm (2.0–2.4 in) wide with a hole in the middle, though some cheonmun lack holes. The hole is thought to represent the moon, while the disc as a whole stands for the sun. The Chogong bon-puri explicitly mentions that the cheonmun are made for the triplets by their father, and they thus represent the paternal and masculine element. A sequence of between two and four Chinese characters are inscribed on one side around the hole, while the other side is smooth. Known sequences include:

- 天 地 門 cheon ji mun "heaven earth gate"
- 天 門 cheon mun "heaven gate"
- 天 大 門 cheon dae mun "heaven great gate"
- 日 月 il wol "sun moon"
- 天 門 日 月 cheon mun il wol "heaven gate sun moon"
- 天 地 日 月 cheon ji il wol "heaven earth sun moon"

The characters suggest that a shaman is one who knows the principles of the cosmos, as represented by heaven and earth or the sun and the moon, and uses this knowledge to help humans, as represented by the gates of their houses.

The sandae (Sino-Korean 算臺 "divinatory platform") is a large and rather flat brass vessel, 10–12 cm (3.9–4.7 in) wide at the mouth and 1.5–3 cm (0.59–1.18 in) tall, in which the two cups and two discs are placed. (Note: Kim Heonsun states that one sandae is 14 cm (5.5 in) wide at the mouth.)

==== Divinatory uses ====
Although the divinatory implements have a number of functions—including serving as props during the reenactment of shamanic narratives—their primary purpose is similar to the knives in that they seek to divine the will of the gods.

The most general divinatory method involves the shaman raising and overturning the sandae, then examining whether how many of the sangjan are upside-down and how many of the cheonmun face up on their inscribed side. There are accordingly nine possibilities. The general principles of divination concern openness and closedness. An upright cup and a disc with the inscribed side up mean that the gateways between the gods and humanity are open. These are usually favorable signs that the gods are willing to descend and that the future will be favorable for the worshippers. But these become dangerous omens at the end of a ritual or in healing ceremonies. The gates being open, the gods are unwilling to leave even after the ritual is done, and the gods of pestilence will not be depart from the patient. Conversely, an upside-down cup and a disc with the smooth side up are considered closed. The gods are unwilling to descend, the worshippers will face misfortune, and both the gods and the spirits of pestilence are willing to leave the human world. The detailed divination outcomes are given below.

| Sangjan | Cheonmun | When gods are invited | Human fortune | When gods are departing | Ritual held again? | Notes |
|---|---|---|---|---|---|---|
| Both open | Both open | Auspicious | Uncertain | Inauspicious | No | |
| Both open | One open | Uncertain | | | Yes | More auspicious than if both cheonmun were closed |
| Both open | Both closed | Uncertain | | | Yes | |
| One open | Both open | Auspicious | | Inauspicious | No | |
| One open | One open | Uncertain | | | Yes | |
| One open | Both closed | Inauspicious | | Auspicious | No | |
| Both closed | Both open | Inauspicious | | Uncertain | No | |
| Both closed | One open | Highly inauspicious and dangerous | | Auspicious | No | Called jeoseung mun "gate of death" |
| Both closed | Both closed | Inauspicious | | Auspicious | No | |

Many other divinatory methods involve either the sangjan, the cheonmun, or both. In one ritual, the shaman shakes the cups and discs in a sieve instead of the sandae, and then throws it into his wife's skirt. In another ritual held for divers, the shaman crawls across the sandbar with the sangjan and cheonmun inside his mouth, reenacting the Dragon King, the god of the sea, who has pearls in his mouth. Once the shaman has reached the worshippers, they spit out the implements onto the earth and divine the gods' will depending on how they fall. For this ritual alone, the resulting configurations are named after dragons. The worst configuration is the White Dragon, when all four implements are closed.

== As sacred objects ==
=== Nature of mengdu ===
The three mengdu are both the symbols and the qualifications of a Jeju shaman. Because they constitute "the most basic and essential” tools of shamanic ritual, a novice shaman cannot attract his own clientele of worshippers but must always be bound as an apprentice to a senior shaman until he can acquire mengdu of his own. Jeju shamans have three fundamental tasks: communion with the gods, healing of the sick, and divination of the future. Jeon Ju-hee suggests that each mengdu corresponds to a task, with the bell that opens the gods' doors standing for communion and the knives that vanquish pestilence symbolizing healing.

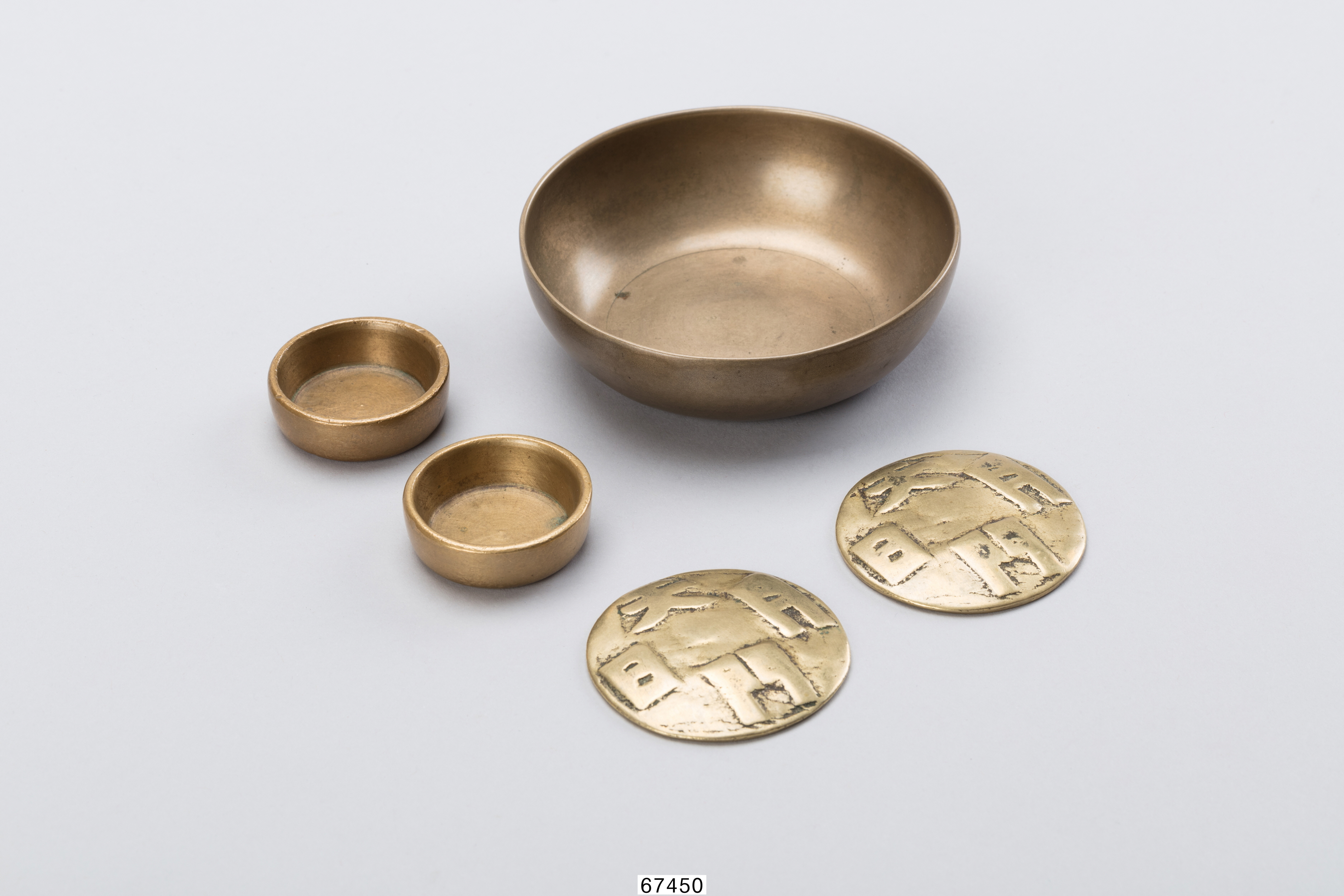
Divination implements of Yi Jung-chun, passed down by twenty-five individuals

Yet the mengdu are not mere ritual tools. Every set of mengdu is believed to embody the spirits of the Mengdu triplets and other figures from the Chogong bon-puri, the spirits of major historical Jeju shamans, and the spirits of shamans who had once used either the same mengdu set or the original set which the current mengdu are based on. (Note: Jeju shamans also include Chinese Taoist mystics such as Guo Pu and Li Chunfeng as ancestral shamans.) Every mengdu set is thus associated with a number of "mengdu ancestors" (mengdu josang), including both universal figures manifested in every Jeju mengdu and shamans only incarnated in the actual implements that they used. Every time that a set is inherited by the next generation of shamans, the previous holder becomes enshrined as the newest mengdu ancestor. The number of specific figures whose spirits occupy the mengdu can become quite large. The high-ranking shaman Yi Jung-chun knew of twenty-four past holders of his implements, including both kin and non-kin.

The mengdu ancestors actively intervene during the rituals to help the current holder accurately ascertain the will of the gods. When Jeju shamans throw their knives or overturn their sandae and look at the resulting configurations, they describe a spontaneous feeling inside their head which allows them to make the correct interpretation of the patterns. This feeling necessitates a deep understanding of the distinctive features of one's mengdu and their associated ancestors, as well as direct aid from the ancestors themselves, which is beseeched for during the ritual.

When a shaman is holding a ritual, there's a something that flashes inside your head. You need to be a shaman to have this feeling... And whether a shaman is competent or not, whether they have sudeok [ritual authority] or not, all depends on whether they can make sound judgments about this [feeling]... When a shaman divines with the mengdu, the gods called the mengdu ancestors that we carry with us judge correctly for us. We can cure the illnesses of the sick and people judge that we have sudeok if they set out the right road for us.

Mengdu with numerous ancestors, or those associated with particularly high-ranking shamans, possess greater spiritual authority and are treated with greater deference by shamans and worshippers alike. By contrast, newly fabricated mengdu not based on any preexisting set have no specific ancestors of their own, and are thought to be prone to inaccurate divination results.

By emphasizing the shared mythical origin of the Chogong bon-puri but also commemorating real historical individuals, the recitation of mengdu genealogies and worship of mengdu ancestors create a sense of solidarity and community among the shamans of Jeju Island. Despite differences in rank and ability, all shamans are bound together by being symbolic descendants of the same mengdu ancestors. This may have contributed to the low degree of regional variation in Jeju shamanism.

=== Transfer and acquisition ===
The mengdu are divided into five types, depending on how they are transferred and acquired across generations.

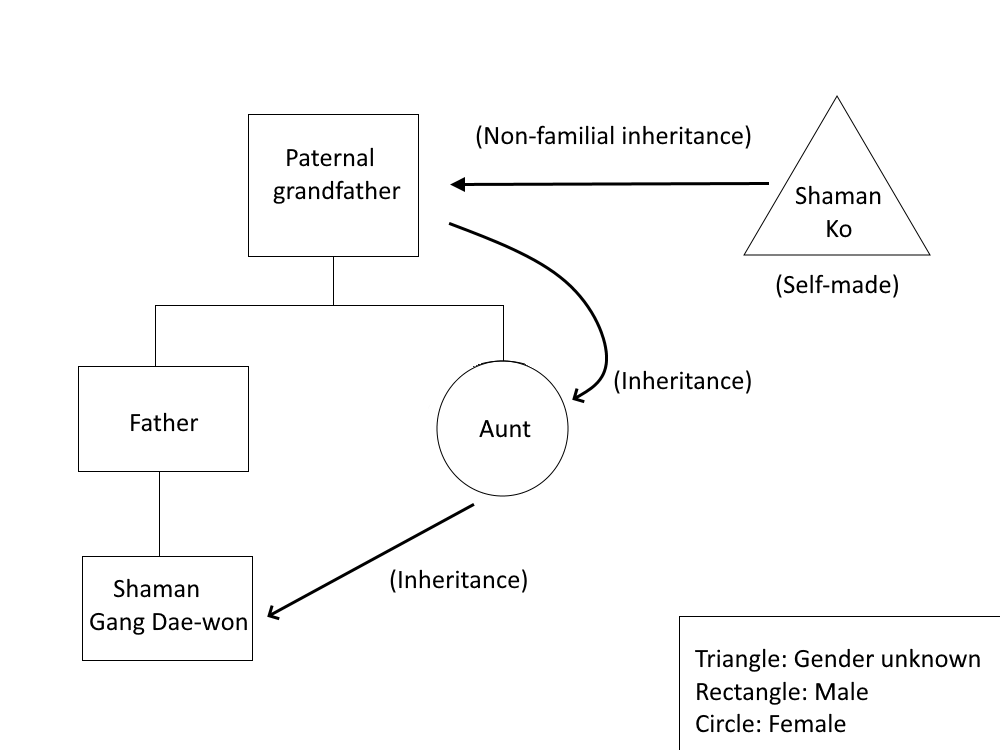
Inheritance of one of the mengdu sets of shaman Gang Dae-won

The most common and most ideal type is "inherited mengdu" (mullin mengdu), passed down by one shaman to another. Inheritance is ideally to a younger family member, with gender being irrelevant. Adopted children are also considered valid heirs. The family of a shaman is under no obligation to inherit their mengdu. But the gods may select certain family members to be shamans by sending them sinbyeong: a series of symptoms that range from hallucination and insanity to a fervent desire to participate in shamanic ritual, and which can be cured only by being inheriting or forging mengdu and being initiated into shamanism. Inheritance is accompanied by a supplementary gift, sometimes in the form of land or property and in other cases in the form of cash payments. Some of the older shaman's clientele of worshippers is also inherited together with the mengdu. Nowadays, inheritance may also be to a worthy disciple, close friend, or even to an unconnected shaman, as direct inheritance is considered preferable to the other means of transfer. However, this is a recent phenomenon due to the ongoing decline in the number of people who want to be traditionally ordained priests, which means that there are often no family members who are willing to take on the mengdu.

When there is no clear inheritor, the mengdu are usually buried next to the final holder's grave. These are called "earth-by-the-grave mengdu" (jejeol mengdu). Although no longer in active use, the genealogy and associated ancestors of these mengdu are still remembered, awaiting a new holder. Often, a shaman who desires to have their personal mengdu actively dig them out. In other cases, the final holder may appear in a dream to tell a descendant to dig out their mengdu, or a novice shaman may be led to the grave by divinely inspired intuition (sin'gi).

Alternately, a shaman without an inheritor may deposit their mengdu above ground, accompanied by rice and cash. Some mengdu are placed on the roadside; others in the hills or riverbanks, under a rock, or underwater. When these are rediscovered, they are referred to as "picked-up mengdu" (bonggeun mengdu). The rediscovery of a mengdu generally leads to sinbyeong for the discoverer, which may be fatal unless they are initiated as shamans in due time. As the previous holder usually cannot be determined, the new genealogy of the implements begins with the place of their discovery. Heirless shamans sometimes choose to donate their mengdu to local Buddhist temples. The Buddhist clergy of Jeju are sympathetic to shamanism, and a novice shaman could eventually take them from the temple and put them to use again.

Some mengdu are called "village shrine mengdu" (bonhyang mengdu) because they are associated with a specific village community. Unlike with other mengdu, the lay members of the community are deeply invested in the fate of the village shrine mengdu. In one historical instance, a thief killed the village shaman and stole her mengdu, only for the entire village to rally to retrieve the sacred objects and to punish the criminal. In another case, the village shaman died without a clear successor, so that her daughter, who had previously lived a laywoman's life as a diver, was obliged to become a shaman to take care of the mengdu and officiate the village rites.

Other mengdu are newly forged, and are termed "self-made mengdu" (jajak mengdu). The brass for the self-made mengdu is traditionally gathered by asking the lay worshippers for donations of brass vessels and cutlery. Once the necessary metal has been pooled, the shaman visits the forge on an auspicious day. An initial ritual is held for the gods of the forge, including Jeon'gyeongnok, the celestial smith who forges the original mengdu in many Chogong bon-puri versions. Once the implements have been forged, they are washed in scented water and wine and dressed with the skirts. A ritual is held to summon the spirits of the ancestors into the new implements. The shaman then holds the first rituals with the mengdu, seeking to ascertain if the mengdu ancestors will hold them in favorable regard.

The self-made mengdu are divided into two types: implements which are based on an original set, and entirely new implements. The former are identical to the originals from a ritual perspective, to the point of embodying the same specific ancestors. The latter is not preferred by shamans, although it is sometimes inevitable, as when someone is initiated without any close friends or relatives who are already shamans. Some shamans make their own mengdu because they are too proud to worship the ancestors of other families.

=== Storage and maintenance ===
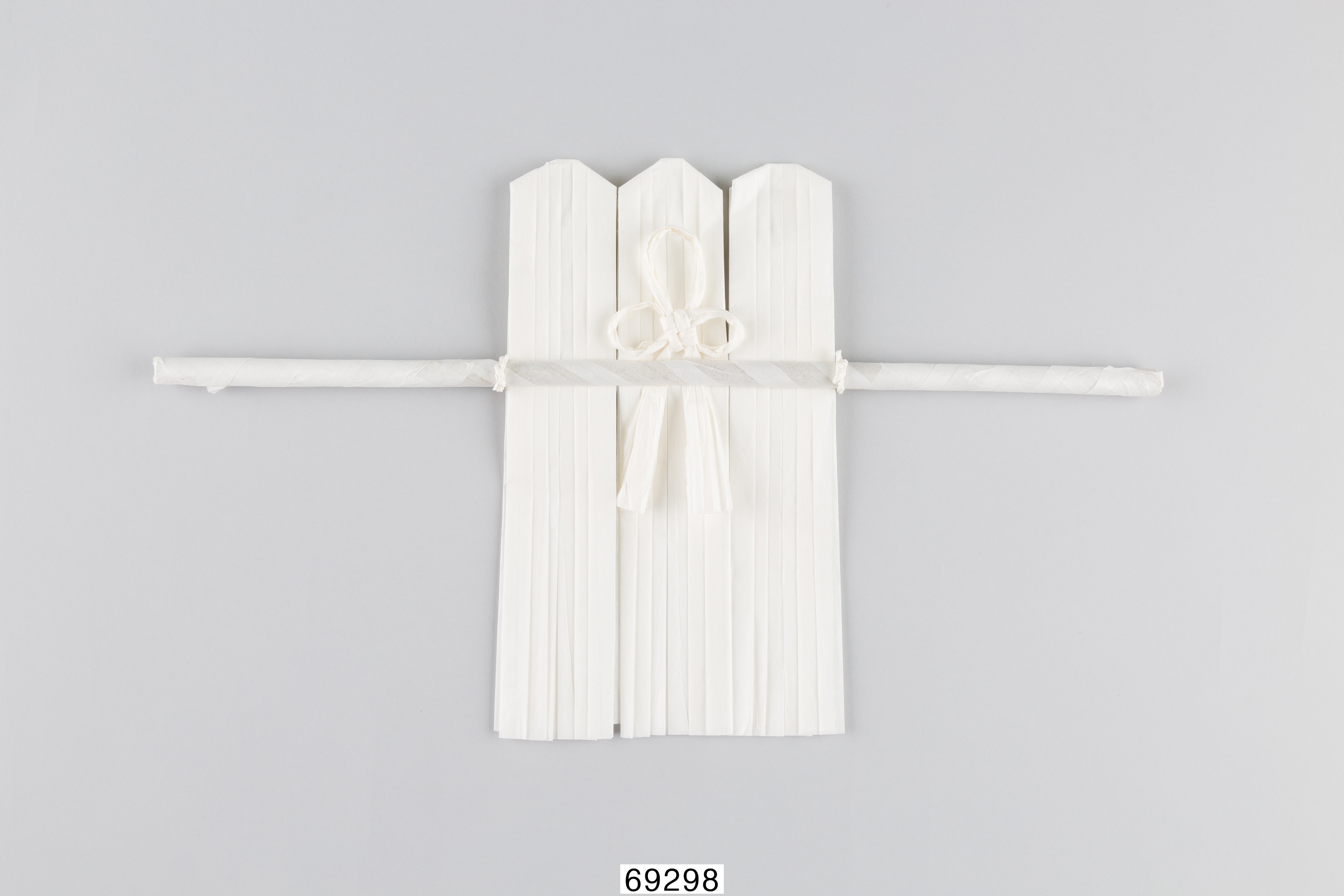
One of the six yuk-gobi that adorn the dangju

The mengdu are traditionally placed on a shelf or in a chest in the rice granary of the shaman's household. As shamans now generally live in Western-style houses without rice granaries, they now tend to store their mengdu in cupboards, cabinets, or closets. In modern households where the sacred tools are all stored in one large cabinet, the mengdu are placed in the uppermost compartment, together with candles, incense and incense burners, rice bowls, threads of cloth, fruits, a supplementary tool used in divination called barang, and any sacred objects that a shaman might personally possess.

The shelf, cupboard or other location where the sacred objects are placed is called dangju. It stands as the symbol of the palace in which the triplets place their ritual implements, and which is guarded by Noga-danpung-agissi and Neosame-neodoryeong. It is adorned by paper representations of the gods, including the yuk-gobi, works of paper and bamboo which represent each of the Mengdu and the Neosameneo-doryeong triplets. The yuk-gobi are hung under the representations of the childbirth goddess, as it was in her land that the triplets could be born.

The mengdu sometimes break or shatter, especially because they are regularly thrown, and must be reforged. Often, inheritance leads to one shaman possessing multiple mengdu, all of whose ancestors must be served. Shamans distinguish between their multiple mengdu sets, using some sets for particular rituals and another set for others. A large number of mengdu is considered inadvisable both in practical terms, as the ancestors of all sets must be maintained, and religiously, as the ancestors of each set might become jealous of each other and lead to discord in the shaman's family as well. Multiple sets may be melted and reforged. In one case, a shaman who had seven sets melted six of them and reforged them into only one, in order to relieve the burden on her family who would succeed her. Another shaman had two sets, one inherited from her great-aunt and another made by her husband. She melted and reforged them into two new sets, both copies of her great-aunt's set, in order to prevent conflict between the ancestors of each set.

=== Associated rituals ===
==== Sin-gut ====
The mengdu feature prominently in the Sin-gut, an extended sequence of rituals which are held three times in a shaman's life and initiate them into a higher hierarchy of the shamanic priesthood. The first Sin-gut serves as an initiation ritual into shamanism itself. In one of the most important parts of this ceremony, the novice kneels before the altar of the gods while a senior shaman feeds him morsels of the sacrificial offerings, calling them a gift from the Mengdu triplets. Once this is done, the senior shaman presses the sangjan and the cheonmun on the shoulders of the kneeling novice, saying that the triplet gods are stamping their seal on him. They then use the divination implements to ascertain whether the novice will be a capable shaman. Having received the triplets' blessing, the novice is given the mengdu, the sacred drums, and the ritual robes, and is formally initiated.

The mengdu are at the center of the Gobun-mengdu ("hidden mengdu"), another important component of the Sin-gut held some time after the initiation. The Gobun-mengdu takes the form of ritual theater. The newly initiated shaman takes a nap, muttering that nobody would dare steal his ritual implements. Meanwhile, the senior shamans hide the implements under the altar for the gods of death. The apprentice shamans then wake up the initiate, saying that there is a ritual to attend to. Finding everything gone, they vainly attempt to make fake mengdu. Segyeong, the goddess of earth and agriculture, eventually informs them that the triplets have confiscated the shaman's mengdu to punish them for their misdeeds. The shaman repents, and Segyeong convinces Noga-danpung-agissi to tell her sons to send the objects back. Although now omitted, the initiate traditionally had to answer a series of riddles about shamanic mythology and ritual in order to retrieve their belongings. For instance, senior shamans would arrange their mengdu in a certain configuration and tell the initiate to interpret it in mythological terms. Ultimately, the mengdu and other implements are returned to the initiate in the order of the bell, the divination implements, and the knives.

Once the mengdu have been retrieved, the sangjan and cheonmun of the initiate and senior shamans are pooled together. After a ritual dance to a very fast beat, the implements are thrown and the will of the gods divined. The divination is repeated until the results are propitious for the initiate.

==== Gongsi-puri ====
The Gongsi-puri, in which the shaman offers sacrifices to the mengdu ancestors, is a component rite of all shamanic ceremonies. In this ceremony, the shaman recounts the story of their own life, from their early life and education to their initiation and training as a novice shaman to their life in the present day. Once this is done, the shaman recites the known genealogy of the mengdu and the means by which they came in possession of it, naming the mengdu ancestors, other important shamans in Jeju history, figures associated with the sacred drums, and even novices and apprentices who failed to become shamans of their own. Sacrifices are offered to each of these individuals with the following invocation, a chicken having been sacrificed in the prior ritual:

"May you receive the cup—a cup and a cup (Note: In the original text, the first instance of "a cup" is given in Sino-Korean 一杯 il bae and the second instance in Korean 한잔 han jan.)—with anju of chicken and egg and with clear gamju and with fragrant soju and with fragrant cheongju."

The Gongsi-puri provides an opportunity for the shaman to look back on his life and to commemorate and thank his family and teachers who nurtured and taught him in life and allow him to successfully carry out rituals in death, as well as reminding the shaman of the interpersonal relationships that form the community of Jeju shamans.

==== Dangju-je ====
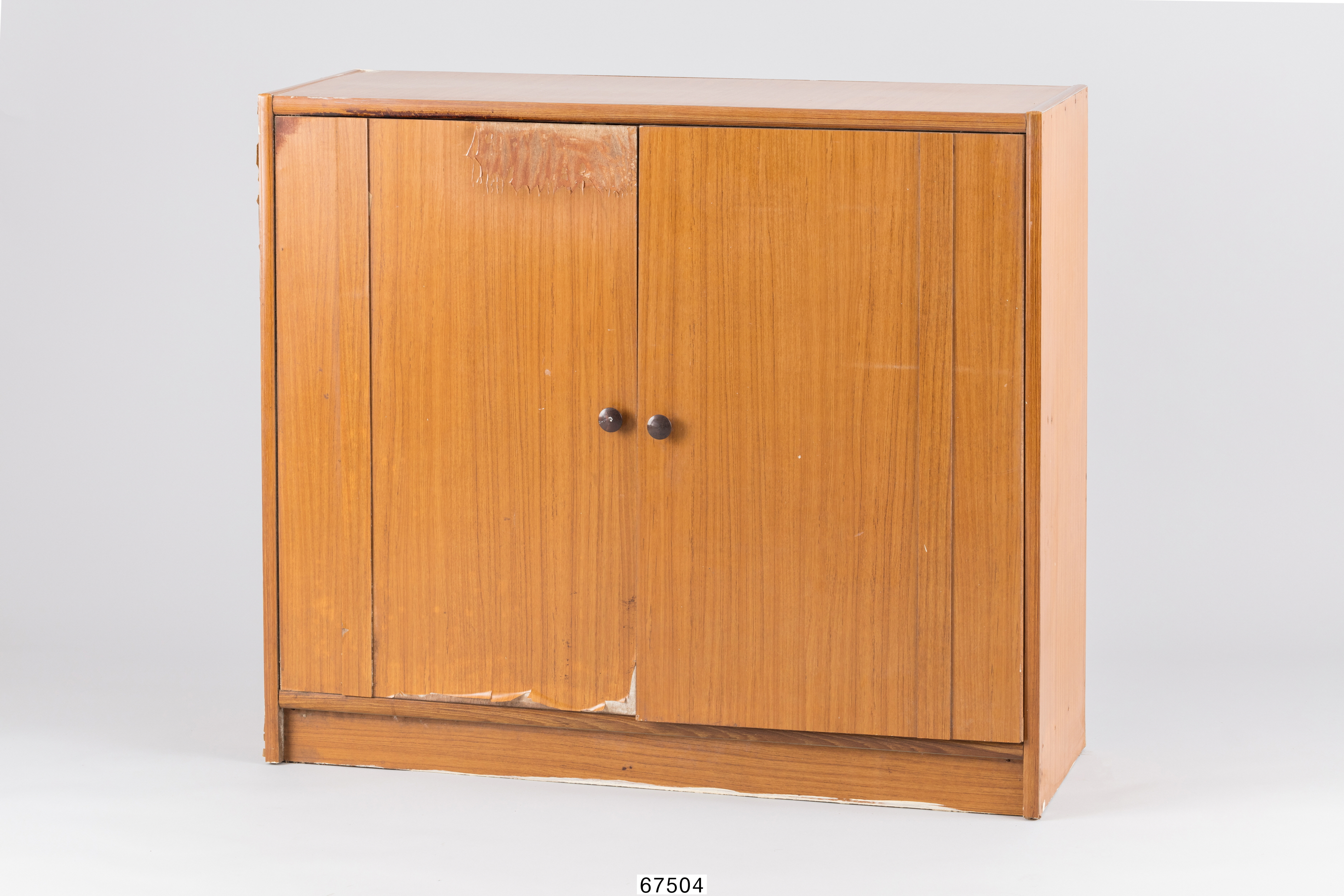
The chest that Yi Jung-chun used as his dangju

The shaman worships their mengdu every day by offering libations and burning candles and incense in the dangju. Every year, the shaman also holds the Dangju-je, a series of three ceremonies specifically dedicated to the mengdu ancestors. These are held on the eighth, eighteenth, and twenty-eighth days of the ninth lunisolar month, roughly October, corresponding to the birthdays of the Mengdu triplets in the Chogong bon-puri. As they involve the creation and elimination of the dangju as a sacred space, the first and last Dangju-je of a shaman's life have special names: Dangju-mueum ("adorning the dangju") and Dangju-jium ("erasing the dangju"). The Dangju-jium may be held after death by another shaman. When a living shaman holds it, it signifies that they are passing down their mengdu to their chosen heir and retiring from ritual practice.

The Dangju-je on the eighth and eighteenth have always been minor affairs that involve only a personal prayer. The final Dangju-je was traditionally an important occasion that many villagers would attend to receive auguries and medical treatment from the shaman, who would dress in ceremonial robes for the occasion. Nowadays, virtually all shamans hold a brief private ritual of under an hour on the twenty-eighth as well, while dressed in ordinary clothes.

== Recorded and modern history ==
Jeju shamans believe that some mengdu sets have been in continuous use for at least five hundred years. But as Korean shamanism is a folk religion historically disparaged by the literate Korean elite, there are only occasional sources to Jeju shamanism from before the twentieth century, centering on the Neo-Confucian notion "that the shamanic beliefs of Jeju were very false and that these 'obscene rites' were causing severe damage."

In the 1630s, a mainlander exiled to Jeju wrote that the island's shamans "throw cups and moon blocks to speak of fortune and misfortune." This is a clear reference to sangjan and cheonmun. In 1704, the magistrate of Jeju wrote that he had "burnt every spirit robe and every spirit metal of the mobs of shamans", where "spirit metal" must refer to the brass mengdu. In the late eighteenth century, a local nobleman included the earliest known use of the word mengdu in a description of how his parents had hired a shaman when he had been very ill as a child:

At the night of the Rat [00:00—02:00] they glared fiercely with their eyes and raised their voices. When expelling the spirits [of sickness] they stabbed at my limbs and body in a disorderly manner with a mengdu [明刀 myeongdo "bright sword"] so that the hair on my head and my body all stood on end.

The first, albeit brief, scholarly mention of the mengdu was in the 1932 publication Shamans of Korea, written by the Japanese ethnologist Murayama Chijun with the support of the Japanese colonial government. It was only in the 1960s that proper academic study of Jeju shamanism began, but few scholars have focused on the mengdu and other material culture of the religion.

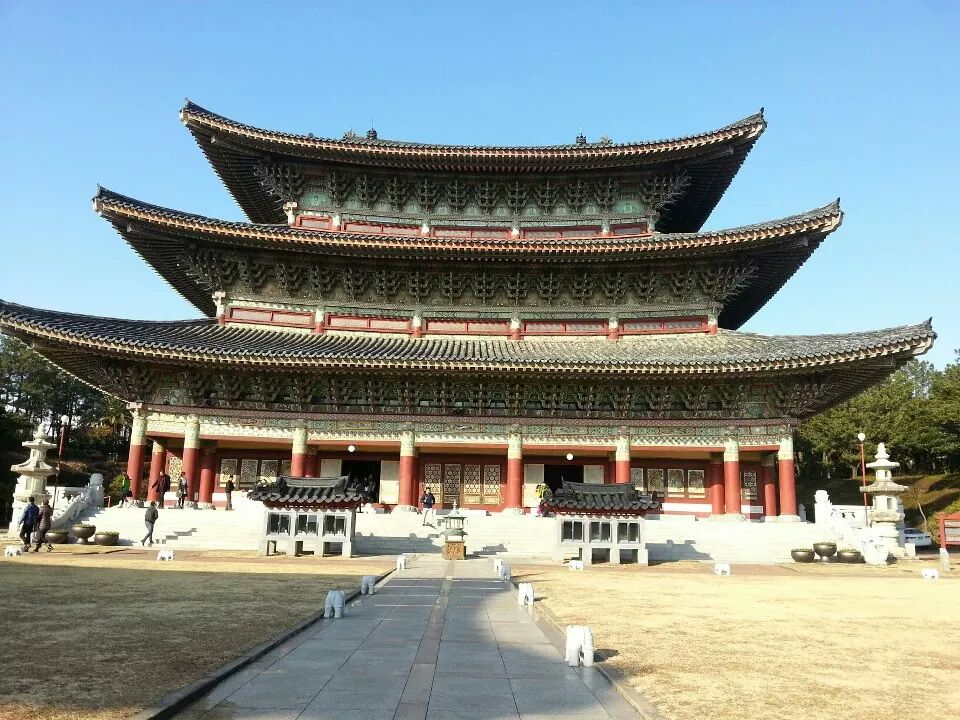
Yakcheonsa, a Buddhist temple in Jeju Island built in 1982

The Jeju religion was coming under severe pressure at the same time that academic research on it was starting. The military junta of Park Chung Hee initiated the Misin tapa undong, a major government program to undermine shamanism, which resulted in the confiscation of many sets of mengdu by the police. 121 new Buddhist temples were built between 1960 and 1990. Due to the already extensive syncretism between Buddhism and shamanism, many worshippers of shamans found it easy to switch to the more socially prestigious Buddhist faith. Urbanization and industrialization also undermined the village base of the religion. As less and fewer people want to be traditionally initiated shamans, the traditionally hereditary nature of mengdu inheritance has broken down. There is currently a glut of mengdu sets to the point that shamans are donating them to museums.

At the same time, others are making new mengdu. South Korean shamanism is currently undergoing a major restructuring in which Seoul shamanism, which is very popular in modern Korean society, is undermining or eliminating local shamanic traditions. In Jeju as well, large numbers of mainland shamans are entering the island, although they are not initiated into the Jeju priesthood and are usually incapable of holding rituals in the Jeju style. The mainlanders are joined by laymen from Jeju who decide to practice shamanic ritual without bothering to undergo the difficult training and initiation processes. Many of these new kinds of ritual practitioners independently make their own mengdu and worship them on special altars of the type seen in Seoul and other northern forms of Korean shamanism. They thus legitimize their nontraditional religious practice by appropriating the symbols of traditional shamanism.

== Outside Jeju ==
Mengdu worship is distinctive to Jeju Island. Korean shamanism is traditionally divided into two major categories. The god-descended shamans of the north (including Seoul) experience sinbyeong when a deity decides to reside in their body. After initiation, this resident deity becomes the source of their shamanic power. These shamans are possessed by other gods and spirits during rituals and convey their will in a trance state. The hereditary shamans of the south do not undergo sinbyeong or trance possession and cannot convey the will of the gods. By externalizing the resident deity in the form of the mengdu, Jeju shamanism displays traits of both. Like the northern shamans, Jeju shamans have the ability to perceive the will of the gods. But unlike in the north, the will of the gods is conveyed not through the shaman's actual body via trance possession, but through the mengdu: sacred objects that are physically separate from the human.

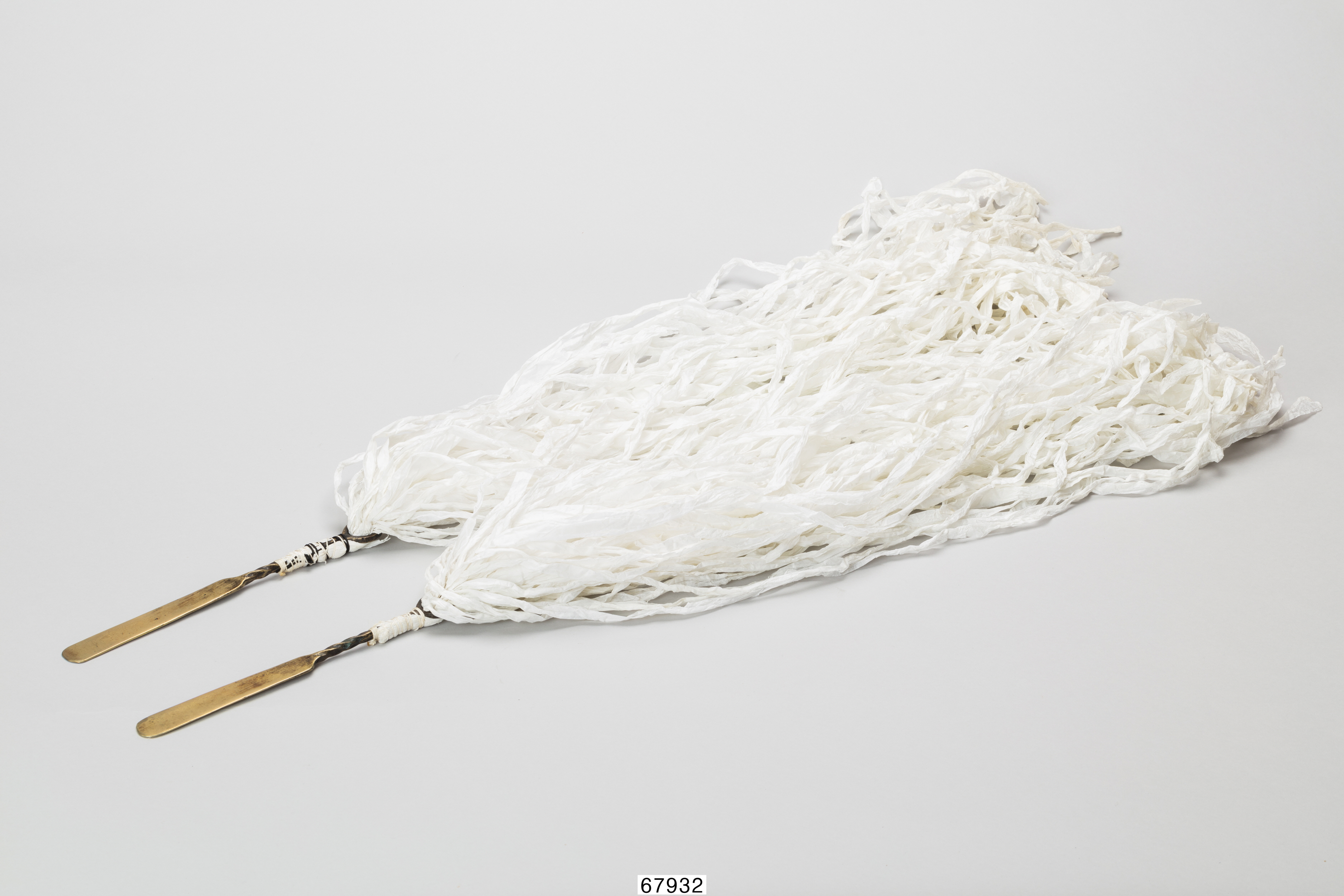
Pair of sacred knives used in Gangwon shamanism, physically similar to Jeju knives

As for the objects themselves, sacred shamanic knives with a close physical resemblance to Jeju knives are common in mainland shamanic traditions. They are generally used to cleanse ritual impurity and expel malevolent spirits rather than divination, although mainland traditions of knife-throwing divination do exist, such as in northern Hwanghae Province where crossed outward blades are in fact considered highly auspicious. Bells that resemble Jeju ones do not exist in mainland Korea, but other sorts of bells do. Ritual bells are a variant of the widespread Korean shamanic tradition of sacred rattles. The cheonmun may be connected to the divinatory use of cash coins in mainland Korea, but no divination cups are known from the mainland, suggesting that the sangjan may have an indigenous origin in Jeju or reflect influence from some non-Korean culture.

Some of the rituals associated with the mengdu have correspondences in mainland Korea. In Hwanghae, the initiate shaman goes about asking lay worshippers for donations of metal to make his sacred rattle, mirror, and other implements, just as Jeju shamans do when making jajak mengdu. During the Hwanghae initiation ritual, senior shamans conceal the newly forged implements and the initiate cannot retrieve them without answering a series of riddles about ritual procedure; the parallels with the Gobun-mengdu are evident. In Seoul, many shamans are struck with sinbyeong after accidentally discovering the three sacred implements: the knife, the rattle, and the fan. The Seoul initiation ritual also involves senior shamans concealing the implements, and the initiate must correctly divine the location where they are hidden in order to join the priesthood.

Potential links with the bronze swords and rattles of Bronze Age Korea, the three unspecified objects from heaven that feature in the myth of Dan'gun, and the sacred sword, mirror, and jewel of the Imperial Regalia of Japan have also been suggested.

== See also ==
- Pusaka in Indonesia
- Sacred bundles in the Americas
