= Princess Bari =

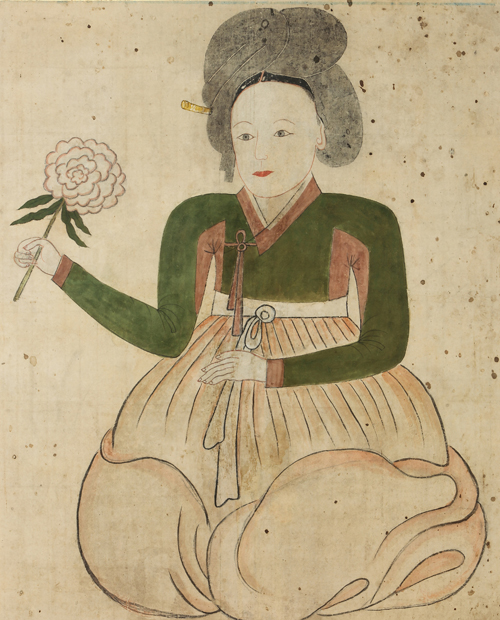

Princess Bari (Korean: 바리공주; Hanja: 峇里公主, Barigongju, also known as Bari-gongju or the Abandoned Princess) is a central figure in mainland Korean shamanism (Muism), venerated as the first shaman (mudang), a psychopomp who guides the souls of the deceased, and the patron goddess of ritual practitioners. Her myth is traditionally recited during the Jinogwi-gut, a shamanic funeral ritual designed to help guide a newly deceased soul safely into the afterlife.

== Mythological narrative ==
Though numerous regional and oral variations of the myth exist across the Korean Peninsula, the core narrative arc follows a consistent structure:

== Birth and abandonment ==
- The King and Queen: A reigning king and queen give birth to six daughters in succession, all of whom are celebrated and raised with great luxury.
- The Disappointing Seventh Child: When the queen becomes pregnant for a seventh time, the royal couple has an auspicious dream and expects a long-awaited crown prince. However, the child is a girl.
- The Name and Exile: Embittered, the king orders the infant to be cast out. He names her Bari, derived from the Korean verb beorida (버리다, meaning "to throw away").
- Rescue: Depending on the version of the myth, the abandoned baby is protected by animals (such as turtles, magpies, or bears) and rescued by divine or celestial figures—most commonly the Buddha (who laments that a woman cannot be his monastic disciple), a mountain spirit (sansin), or a stork.

== The quest to the underworld ==
- The Royal Illness: Years later, both or one of the king and queen fall gravely, incurably ill.
- The Oracle's Decree: Divination reveals that the illness can only be cured with medicinal water, magical blossoms (the flower of resurrection), or sacred fruit from the Western Heaven (Seocheon) managed by the Lord of the Underworld.
- The Rejection of the Elder Six: None of the six favored daughters are willing to undertake the perilous, multi-year journey to the netherworld.
- Bari's Return: Hearing of her parents' plight, Bari steps forward and volunteers to make the journey, despite having been cast aside at birth.
- The Journey: Bari travels to the underworld, often enduring trials, crossing treacherous rivers or fire pits, and serving the underworld ruler (frequently depicted as cleaning, chopping wood, or bearing children for him) to earn the medicinal water and the flower of resurrection.

== Apotheosis ==
- Reviving the Parents: Bari returns just in time to sprinkle the healing water and present the flower of resurrection at her parents' funeral or sickbed, restoring them to life.
- Ascension: Rather than remaining a human princess in the royal court, Bari rejects worldly rank and ascends to the divine realm, becoming a immortal goddess and the ancestral patron of mudang (shamans), a psychopomp who leads lost or suffering souls to paradise.

== Religious and cultural significance ==
- Patron of Shamans: In Korean shamanic lineage, Princess Bari is recognized as the primordial shaman who first mapped the path between the worlds of the living and the dead.
- Funeral Rites (Jinogwi-gut): Her epic chant (Bari-gongju-ga) is traditionally sung by shamans during death rituals to comfort the bereaved and clear a smooth passage for the soul's reincarnation or entry into a peaceful afterlife.
- Symbolism: The myth subverts traditional Joseon-era patriarchal norms by elevating an unwanted, discarded daughter into a supreme savior capable of rescuing even the king who abandoned her.

== In popular culture ==
Princess Bari's mythos and name have been adapted across contemporary media, webtoons, and video games:

- Literature & Webtoons: Retellings and digital comics (such as Princess Bari on platforms like NamuWiki) re-interpret her folkloric motifs through modern fantasy and historical lenses.
- Video Games: Characters or entities inspired by or named Princess Bari appear in regional and international titles (such as Limbus Company, Idle Angels, and SMITE 2).
