= Mu (shaman) =

Korean shamans

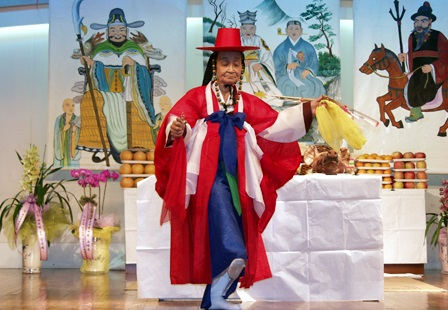
Mudang Oh Su-bok, mistress of the dodang-gut of Gyeonggi, holding a service to placate the angry spirits of the dead.

Mu (Korean: 무) is the Korean term for a shaman in Korean shamanism. Korean shamans hold rituals called gut for the welfare of the individuals and society.

In modern Korea different terms are used to define shamans, including mudang (mostly for females), baksu (only for males), tangol (for hereditary shamans), and musogin ("people who do shamanism", used in the context of organised shamanism).

== Etymology ==
The Korean word 무 mu is written with the chinese character Wu 巫 , which defines shamans of either sex. Korean shamanic terminology has, however, at least a partial origin in Siberian languages. Already in records from the Yi dynasty, mudang has a prevalent usage. Mudang itself is explained in relation to Chinese characters, as originally referring to the "hall", 堂 tang, of a shaman. Although the hanja 堂 can also refer to people belonging to the same clan, despite the more popular meaning of a large hall or meeting room, so perhaps that definition pertains to the term of mudang. A different etymology, however, explains mudang as stemming directly from the Siberian term for female shamans, utagan or utakan.

Mudang is used mostly, but not exclusively, for female shamans. Male shamans are called by a variety of names, including sana mudang (literally "male mudang") in the Seoul area, or baksu mudang, also shortened baksu ("doctor", "healer"), in the Pyongyang area. According to some scholars, baksu is an ancient authentic designation of male shamans, and locutions like sana mudang or baksu mudang are recent coinages due to the prevalence of female shamans in recent centuries. Baksu may be a Korean adaptation of terms loaned from Siberian languages, such as baksi, balsi or bahsih.

The theory of a Siberian origin of Korean shamanic terminology is more reasonable than theories which explain such terminology as originating in Chinese, given that Chinese culture influenced Korea only at a relatively recent stage of Korean history. Likely, when Koreans adopted Chinese characters they filtered their previously oral religious culture through the sieve of Chinese culture. Another term, mostly used in contemporary South Korea in the context of shamanic associations, is musogin, which means "people who do shamanism".

== Role of the mu ==
The work of the mu is based on the holistic model, which takes into consideration, not only the whole person, but the individual's interaction with their environment, thus both the inner and outer world. The soul is considered the source of life breath, and any physical illness is considered to be inextricably linked with sickness of the soul. Illness of the mind has its cause in soul loss, intrusion or possession by malevolent spirits.

The gut, rites practised by Korean shamans, have gone through a number of changes since the Silla and Goryeo periods. Even during the Joseon dynasty, which established Korean Confucianism as the state religion, shamanic rites persisted. In the past, such rites included agricultural rites, such as prayers for abundant harvest. With a shift away from agriculture in modern Korea, agricultural rites have largely been lost and modern-day shamans are more focused on the spiritual issues of urban life.

== Myths about the origin of Korean shamans ==
In all the myths which figuratively explain the role of the shamans, it is implied that they are media, intermediaries, of higher forms of being. They are not ordained institutionally, but receive ordination from gods, spirits or human ghosts.

Generally, these myths explain that shamans, whom in the most recent history of Korea are regarded as belonging to the lowest class of society (cheonmin 천민), have a forgotten divine or princely nature, often coming from a blood lineage that may be traced back to the early founders of civilisation. Further features of these myths are symbols of divine presence, such as the holy mountain and the holy tree, and tragic or painful experiences.

The bear is an animal often present in such myths, with parallels in the mythologies of Siberia.

=== Sungmo—the Holy Mother ===
In a collection of myths, the origin of the shamans is linked to a mother goddess associated with a mountain and presented as either the mother or the spiritual daughter of the "Heavenly King". She has different names according to different regions and associated mountains: Sungmo ("Holy Mother"), Daemo ("Great Mother"), Jamo ("Benevolent Mother"), Sinmo ("Divine Mother"), Nogo ("Olden Maiden"), and others. In other myths she is a mortal princess who is later turned into a goddess.

These myths usually tell of a man, Pobu Hwasang, who encountered the "Holy Mother [of the Heavenly King]" on the top of a mountain. The Holy Mother then became a human being and married the man who met her, giving birth to eight girls, the first mudang. According to some scholars, this myth was first elaborated in the Silla period, when Buddhism and influences from China had already penetrated the Korean peninsula.

The myth of the princess is the most popular, and it differs from region to region. In one of the versions, the princess is Ahwang Kongju of the Yao kingdom, located on the Asian mainland. The princess had a strong link with divinity, granting welfare to her people. Her father sent the princess among the people, whom began to worship her for her healing powers. The first mudang were established as her successors. The princess is worshipped with seasonal offerings in Chungcheong. The yellow and red clothes worn by the mudang are regarded as Ahwang Kongju's robes.

In the north of the Korean peninsula the princess is known as Chil Kongju (the "Seventh Princess"), seventh amongst the daughters of the king. The myth tells that she was rejected by her father, who sealed her in a stone coffin and cast it into a pond, but she was rescued by a Dragon King sent by the Heavenly King, and ascended to the western sky becoming the goddess of healing waters. Names of the goddess in other local traditions Pali Kongju and Kongsim. In the tradition of Jeju Island, where there are more male baksu than female mudang, the myth tells of a prince as the ancestor of all shamans.

=== Dangun—the Sandalwood King ===
Dangun is traditionally considered to be the grandson of Hwanin, the "Heavenly King", and founder of the Korean nation. This myth is reputed to be older than that of the mother goddess. Myths similar to that of Dangun are found in Ainu and Siberian cultures.

The myth starts with prince Hwanung ("Heavenly Prince"), son of Hwanin. The prince asked his father to grant him governance over Korea. Hwanin accepted, and Hwanung was sent to Earth bearing three Heavenly Seals and accompanied by three thousand followers. The prince arrived under the holy tree of sandalwood (Sintansu 신단수, 神檀樹) on the holy mountain, where he founded his holy city.

At the time of his reign, Ungnyeo or Ungnye (웅녀, 熊女)—who was a she-bear—and a tiger were living in a cave near the holy city, praying earnestly that their wish to become part of mankind might be fulfilled. Ungnyeo patiently endured weariness and hunger, and after twenty-one days she was transformed into a beautiful woman, while the tiger ran away for it could not tolerate the effort. The woman Ungnyeo was overjoyed, and visiting the sandalwood city she prayed that she might become the mother of a child.

Ungnye's wish was fulfilled, so that she became the queen and gave birth to a prince who was given the royal name of Dangun, the "Sandalwood King". Dangun reigned as the first human king of Korea, giving to his kingdom the name of Joseon, "Land of the Morning Calm".

According to some scholars, the name Dangun is related to the Siberian Tengri ("Heaven"), while the bear is a symbol of the Big Dipper (Ursa Major). Later in the myth, Dangun becomes the Sansin, the "Mountain God" (metaphorically of civilising growth, prosperity).

== Types of Korean shamans ==
Korean shamans may be classified into two categories: ❶ sesseumu or tangol (당골), people who are shamans and have the right to perform rites by family lineage; and ❷ kangshinmu, people who become shamans through an initiation ceremony. Hereditary shamans were historically concentrated in the southern part of the Korean Peninsula, while initiated shamans were found throughout the entire peninsula but were peculiar to the northern half, the contiguous areas of China inhabited by Koreans, and the central regions along the Han River.

=== Kangshinmu—initiated shamans ===
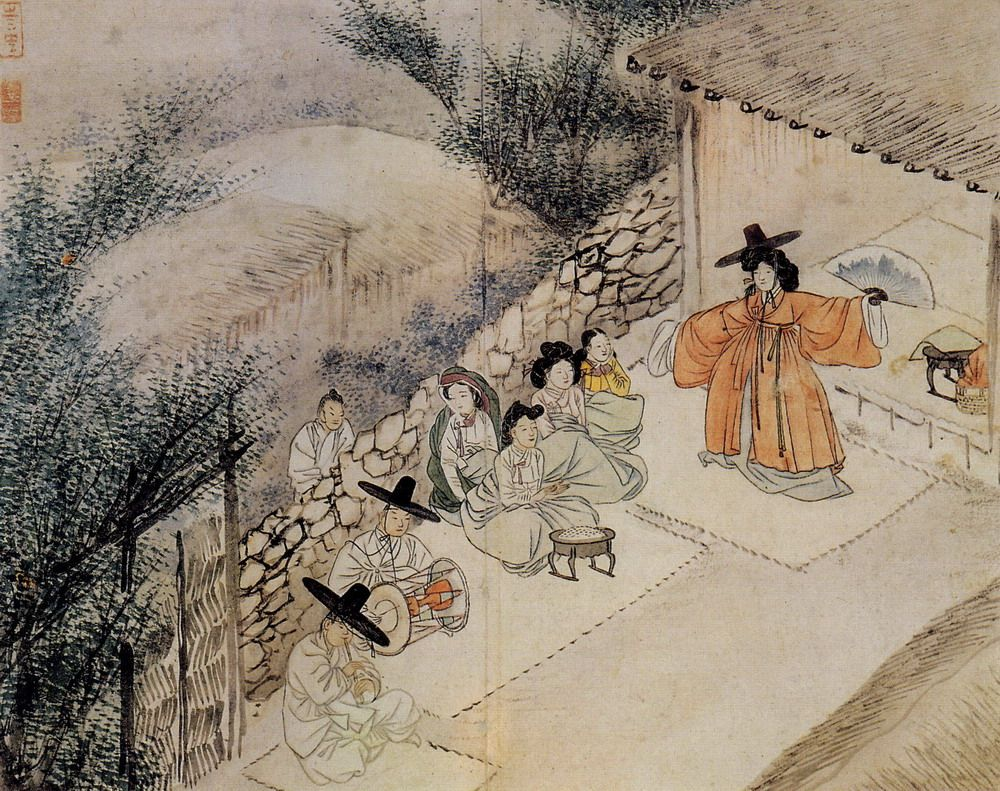
Munyeo sinmu (무녀신무; 巫女神舞), painted by Shin Yunbok in the late Joseon (1805).

Kangshinmu (강신무; 降神巫) are historically found throughout Korea, but they are peculiar to the central and northern regions of the peninsula and the lands of modern-day China contiguous to the northern part of the peninsula. The essential characteristic of the kangshinmu is that they acquire their status by being "chosen" and possessed by a god. There are two subtypes of kangshinmu: ① General mudang and ② myŏngdu.

A person becomes a kangshinmu undergoing a period of shinbyeong (神病), "divine illness". The possession by the god is said to be accompanied by physical pain and psychosis. Believers assert that the "divine illness" may not be healed through medical treatments, but only through the full communion with the spirit.

Mudang are shamans who are possessed by a god or a spirit, called a momju. They perform fortune telling using spiritual powers derived from their possession, and lead gut rituals involving song and dance. A sub-type of mudang is the sŏnmudang or posal, who are thought to have acquired power through spiritual experience, but are still not worthy of holding an orthodox gut. Many male shamans, baksu, belong to this category.

Myŏngdu differ from the general mudang in that they channel the spirit of a dead person, usually a young child related to the myŏngdu himself, rather than a god, and invite such spirits to take residence into shrines set up in their homes. Myŏngdu are found primarily in the Honam region of Korea.

=== Seseummu—hereditary shamans ===
Seseummu (세습무; 世襲巫), found in the area south of the Han River, receive their status as shamans by family bloodline. There are two subtypes of seseummu: ① Simbang and ② tangol.

The simbang-type shamans are found only in Jeju Island, and combine features of the mudang and dan'gol types. Like the mudang, the simbang of Jeju are associated with a specific set of gods. But these gods do not inhabit the shaman's body but are externalized in the form of the mengdu, a set of sacred ritual implements in which the gods and spirits of dead shamans are embodied. The simbang's basic task is to understand the divine message conveyed by their mengdu and to use the mengdu to worship the gods.

Tangol are a type of shaman found predominantly in the southernmost regions of the Korean peninsula, especially in Yeongnam (Gyeongsang) and Honam area (Jeolla). Each one of the tangol families of Honam had districts of influence (tangolpan) in which they had the exclusive right to perform gut rites. Rituals performed by tangol involve song and dance to entertain a god or goddess. Both the rights of succession and the ceremonies have been systematised, so that they now bear the characteristics of a religious institution. Unlike other types of Korean shamans, tangol do not receive a particular god as part of an initiation ceremony and may therefore work with a variety of gods. They do not keep shrines in their homes.

== Shamans during the Japanese occupation ==
During the Japanese occupation of Korea, the Japanese authorities, out of a sense of superiority, would force the Koreans to assimilate into their culture. The Japanese would force the Koreans to pay respect for the fallen soldiers of the Japanese army. Along with assaulting the Korean people and their culture, the Japanese also started to attack Shamanism. Noting that Shamanism was on the list of fake religions, the Japanese despised the noise, rituals and dancing that went along with the Shamans.

The Shamans were told that they needed to change their names to Japanese names and to learn Japanese. Most of the Shamans refused to do so, those that complied were favored by the Japanese but despised by other Shamans. After not being able to fully assimilate the Shamans, the Japanese decided to try and mix Korean shamanism into the Japanese Shinto. This proved to be more problematic because when the deities were displayed, they would display Tan’gun, the first Korean and supreme shaman, and Amaterasu, the Japanese goddess of the sun. When they were displayed together it caused unrest to most because there were arguments on which deity was more supreme.

== Shamanism in other religions ==
Shamanism in Korea predates all other religions in the region. Shamanism was also influential to other religions such as Christianity, Buddhism, Daoism, and Confucianism. Since shamanism is about all things living, dead and divine beings, Shamans are the ones who have been given the task to communicate what the dead and the gods need or want. Shamans also perform (gut) rites to appease the gods and in modern times they also provide charms and talismans for luck or to ward off disease.

After other religions started to come to the Korean nation, shamanism, and shamans were being shamed and persecuted. Confucianism, during the Joseon period, became the religion of the state. During this time Shamans were not only ridiculed, mistreated, and humiliated, they were also still consulted and asked to help during famines and when natural disasters would occur.

Shamans still practiced throughout the Joseon dynasty and into the Japanese occupation. The Japanese, begrudgingly tried to incorporate Shamanism into their native Shinto. Buddhism uses a lot of shamanistic rituals and throughout the Korean history you can see the two religions intertwined and working with each other. Buddhism also holds a place in Korean Shamanism and the rites. The rites are performed in trance from the shaman and with drums and bells and singing.

By the 1800s, Christianity came to Korea and the Christians found that they did not need to introduce the concept of spiritual beings to the Koreans. They found that Shamanism was already knowledgeable in the “beyond.” However, the Christians turned their nose up to the Shamans and Shamanism for being “idolaters.”

In Daoism, the Jade Emperor is the first God of the Chinese. The Jade Emperor is also revered by Korean Shamans, and he controls fortune and faith.

Shamans and Shamanism have been involved in the conception of Korea in the beginning and has outlived the many dynasties of the nation. It intertwines into everyday life and through other religions. Many Koreans still use shamans and shamanism even being a part of another religion.

== See also ==
- Muism
- Babaylan, female shamans in Filipino animism
- Bobohizan, female shamans among the Kadazan-Dusun
- Kaminchu, female shamans in Ryukyuan religion
- Miko, female shamans in Japanese Shinto
- Shamanism
- Wu (shaman)—Wuism, shamans in Chinese animism
