= Sinbyeong =

Korean culture-bound syndrome

- Hangul: 신병
- Hanja: 神病
- RR: sinbyeong
- MR: sinpyŏng

Sinbyeong or shinbyong or shinbyeong, also called "self-loss", is the possession from a god that a chosen mu (shaman) goes through in the Korean shamanic tradition. It is said to be accompanied by physical pain and psychosis. Believers would assert that the physical and mental symptoms are not subject to medical treatment, but may only be cured through acceptance of and full communion with the spirit.

The illness is characterized by a loss of appetite, insomnia, visual and auditory hallucinations. A ritual called a naerim-gut cures this illness, which also serves to induct the new shaman-priest.

== Symptoms ==
The symptoms of a shinbyeong differ, depending on the mu cultural background as well as her surrounding environment. For example, in the most basic, frequent type of shinbyeong, the initiate is afflicted with the characteristic symptoms without apparent cause. The mudang cannot eat and becomes weak physically and psychologically. In another type of shinbyeong, these basic symptoms are preceded by physical illness. In yet another, the shinbyeong is caused by a psychotic episode. In a type of shinbyeong that is relatively rare, the mu mental state becomes weakened through external shock. Another rarely occurring type of shinbyeong, called the "dream appearance type", the shinbyeong is triggered by a dream in which the mu sees a god, spirit, or unusual occurrence, accompanied by a revelation.

The symptoms of the shinbyeong can last a surprisingly long time: an average of 8 years and as many as 30. Most mu have little appetite during their shinbyeong, some suffer from indigestion and partake only on a limited diet. The body of the mudang becomes weak and is subject to pain and cramping accompanied by bloody stool in some cases. Physical symptoms progress to include mental illness. The initiate has a generally restless mind and is said to experience dreams in which she communicates with gods or spirits. Eventually dreams and reality become blurred and the mudang suffers hallucinations. In some cases, the mental illness becomes so extreme that the mu leaves home and wanders through mountains and rice fields. The symptoms are said not to be susceptible to normal medical treatment and such treatment is believed to only exacerbate them. Rather, the symptoms are alleviated through the ritual of gangshinje, a type of gut in which the mu receives her god or spirit.

In the fourth version of the Diagnostic and Statistical Manual of Mental Disorders (DSM-IV), published by the American Psychiatric Association, shinbyeong, or shin-byung, is listed as an example of a culture-bound syndrome. It describes the syndrome as initially characterized by anxiety and somatic complaints (general weakness, dizziness, fear, anorexia, insomnia, gastrointestinal problems), with subsequent dissociation and possession by ancestral spirits.

== Religious aspects ==
In the tradition of Muism, the shinbyeong is considered a structured religious experience demonstrating the vertical connection between god and humanity and showing that "god in some form exists in human consciousness." It is a form of revelation that causes the shaman to become one with god and, consequently, change his or her patterns of thought. The shinbyeong is dissociated from reality and enters a higher form of consciousness.

== See also ==
- Mu (shaman)
- Muism

== Bibliography ==
- Kim, Tae-kon (1998). Korean Shamanism—Muism. Jimoondang Publishing Company. ISBN 89-88095-09-X. Translated by Chang Soo-kyung.
