= Genius loci =

Protective spirit of a place in classical Roman religion

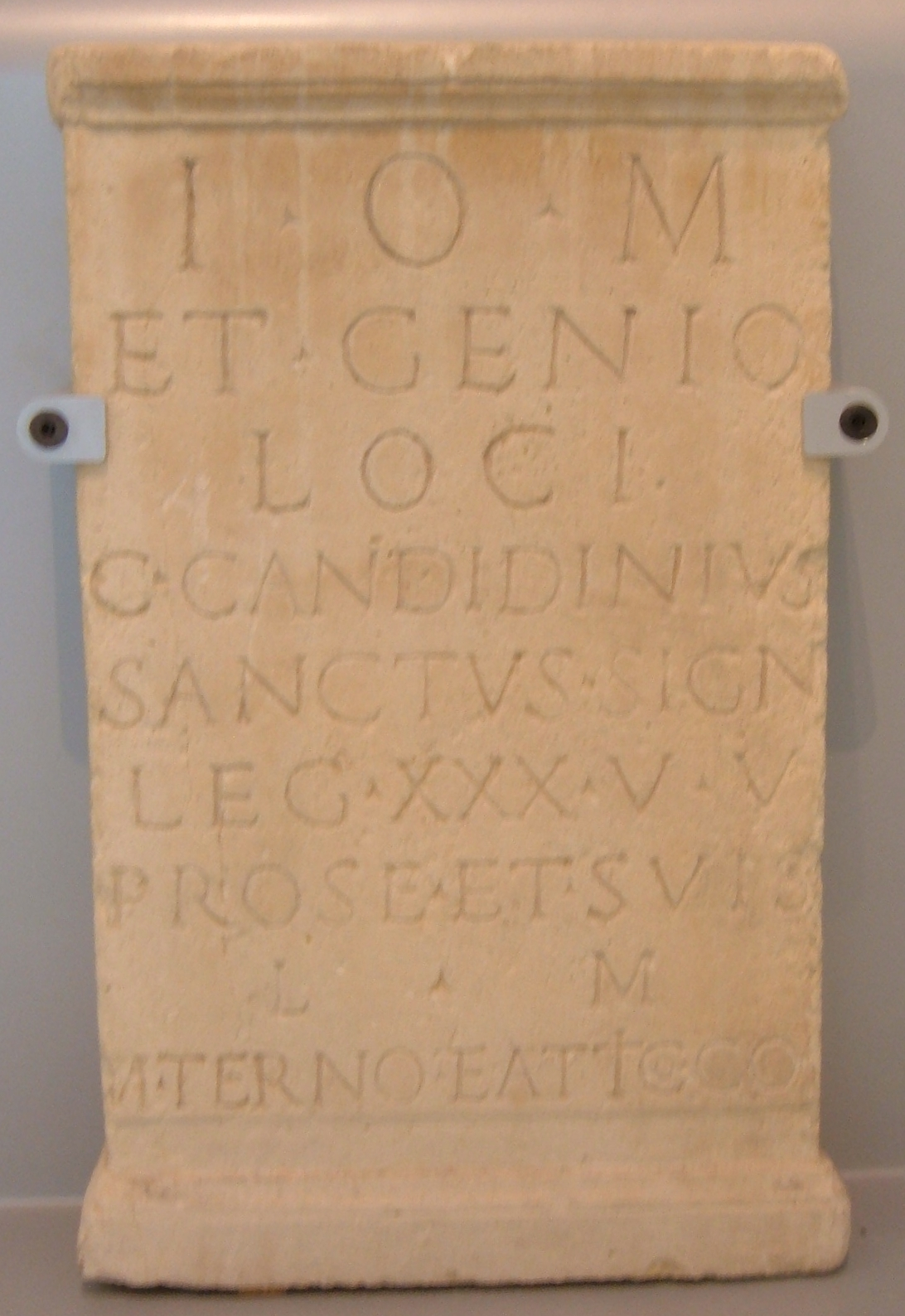
Votive inscription to Jupiter Optimus Maximus and the Genius loci by the Signifer of Legio XXX Ulpia Victrix on behalf himself and his own legion during the consulate of Maternus and Atticus (185 AD)

In classical Roman religion, a genius loci (pl.: genii locorum) was the protective spirit of a place. It was often depicted in religious iconography as a figure holding attributes such as a cornucopia, patera (libation bowl), or snake. Many Roman altars found throughout the Western Roman Empire were dedicated to a particular genius loci. The Roman imperial cults of the Emperor and the imperial house developed in part in connection with the sacrifices made by neighborhood associations (vici) to the local genius. These 265 local districts had their cult organised around the Lares Compitales (guardian spirits or lares of the crossroads), which the emperor Augustus transformed into Lares Augusti along with the Genius Augusti. The emperor's genius is then regarded as the genius loci of the Roman Empire as a whole.

Roman examples of these genii can be found, for instance, at the church of St. Giles, Tockenham, Wiltshire, England, where the genius loci is depicted as a relief in the wall of a Norman church built of Roman material. This shows "a youthful and curly-haired Roman Genius worked in high relief, holding a cornucopia in his left hand and a patera in his right", which previously has been "erroneously identified as Asclepius".

== Western usage ==
In contemporary usage, genius loci usually refers to a location's distinctive atmosphere or a "spirit of the place" rather than necessarily a guardian spirit. An example of contemporary usage might be "Light reveals the genius loci of a place."

== Art and architecture ==
Alexander Pope made the genius loci an important principle in garden and landscape design with the following lines from Epistle IV, to Richard Boyle, Earl of Burlington:

Consult the Genius of the Place in all;
That tells the Waters or to rise, or fall,
Or helps th' ambitious Hill the heav'n to scale,
Or scoops in circling theatres the Vale,
Calls in the Country, catches opening glades,
Joins willing woods, and varies shades from shades,
Now breaks or now directs, th' intending Lines;
Paints as you plant, and, as you work, designs.

Pope's verse laid the foundation for one of the most widely agreed principles of landscape architecture, that landscape designs should always be adapted to the context in which they are located.

A priori, archetype, and genius loci are the primary principals of Neo-Rationalism or New Rationalism. Pioneered by the Italian architect Aldo Rossi, Neo-Rationalism developed in the light of a re-evaluation of the work of Giuseppe Terragni and gained momentum through the work of Giorgio Grassi. Characterized by elemental vernacular forms and an adaptation to the existing environment, the Neo-Rationalist style has adherents beyond architecture in the greater world of art.

In the context of modern architectural theory, genius loci has profound implications for place-making, falling within the philosophical branch of phenomenology. This field of architectural discourse is explored most notably by the theorist Christian Norberg-Schulz in his book, Genius Loci: Towards a Phenomenology of Architecture.

== Modern fantasy ==
Adaptations of the original concept of the genius loci appear in some modern fantasy works.

Tom Bombadil in The Lord of the Rings has been described by Tolkien scholar Tom Shippey as the genius loci of the Old Forest, a wooded land bordering the Shire.

In the Dungeons and Dragons 3.0 edition book the Epic Level Handbook, the genius loci is a malign, powerful ooze that mimics the landscape and has no intelligence of its own. It can magically enslave a visitor whose mind affects the genius loci's behaviour. It is spontaneously generated when a place is undisturbed for a long time.

In The Dresden Files, a genius loci is an elemental spirit of a place. The island of Demonreach has a genius loci, also named Demonreach, which is omniscient regarding the island. Wizards can form a spiritual connection with a genius loci and the place it represents.

The Rivers of London series of novels by Ben Aaronovitch feature many beings described as genii locorum, primarily those of the River Thames and its tributaries.

== See also ==
- Household deity/Hearth goddess
- Tutelary deity
- Lares/Penates
- Jinn
- Germanic versions
  - Hulder
  - Huldufólk
  - Landvættir
  - Nisse/Tomte
  - Rå
  - Kobold/Drak/Schrat
  - Wight/Wicht
- Chinese versions
  - Cheng Huang Gong (City God), Chinese official urban equivalent
  - Tu Di Gong (Earth Deity), Chinese locality equivalent
  - Dizhu shen (Landlord deity), Chinese equivalent for small regions like buildings
- Japanese versions (kami)
  - Tochigami/Jinushigami/Chinjugami/Ubusunagami
  - Zashiki-warashi
- Seonangshin, Korean equivalent
- Spirit house
- Pukwudgie
- Tuatha Dé Danann
- Leshy
- Nymph
- Haltija
- Zeitgeist
