= Hok Tek Cheng Sin =

God of Prosperity in Chinese folk religion

Hok Tek Cheng Sin (Chinese: 福德正神; pinyin: Fúdé Zhèngshén; Pe̍h-ōe-jī: Hok-tek Chèng-sîn, lit. Righteous God of Virtue and Blessing) is a God of Prosperity in Chinese folk religion in Fujian, Taiwan and among Hoklo people in South-East Asia. He is often considered to be similar to Tu Di Gong (Earth Deities) or the name was considered as an official title of the later, but actually both of them are separate deities of different ranking. As one of the oldest deity by age, he is often considered as subordinate of Houtu.

== Mythology ==
One of the legend said that there was a man who lived under the reign of King Wu of Zhou; His name was Thio Hok Tek (張福德). He was born at 1143 BC on the second year of King Wu's reign, on the second day of second month of Chinese Calendar. He was a bright yet kind hearted as a kid. When he was 7 years old, he already learned old Chinese Classics and empathized the poor. Thio Hok Tek became a government tax officer when he was 36 and he was a wise and good officer and people loved him. He died when he was 102 years old at 1042 BC on the reign of King Cheng of Zhou. But after three days, his deceased body had not rotted and amazed all the people.

His position was taken by Wei Chao that oppressed people by his greedy and cruel character. Many people left their homeland and farms, and they wished to have a wise new officer just like Thio Hok Tek. They worshiped him and called him Hok Tek Cheng Sin. One poor family had wished to build an altar for him, but they just could afford four pieces of bricks to build. They used three bricks as the walls and one as the roof, wrote down the name of Hok Tek Cheng Sin inside it and use a broken crock as tripod to put the incense. Unexpectedly, the poor family became rich and many people turned to believe in Thio Hok Tek; built a temple for him. A poem said that the kindness of Thio Hok Tek moved Jade Emperor whose in turned sent Eight Immortals to pick him up to heaven.

Both Hok Tek Cheng Sin and Tudigong are described as sitting white haired old men with white long beard. The main differences between the two deities are that Hok Tek Cheng Sin is a wealth deity with no connection to the earth while Tudigong are a group of low-ranking earth deities with limited length of service. While Hok Tek Cheng Sin's altar is placed high above the floor; Tudigong's altar are built just on the ground and usually accompanied by Tudipo his wife and the tiger god who will assist Tudigong to ward off evil.
