= Mun San Fook Tuck Chee temple =

Cantonese temple

Kong Mun San Fook Tuck Chee
- 沙岡萬山福德祠
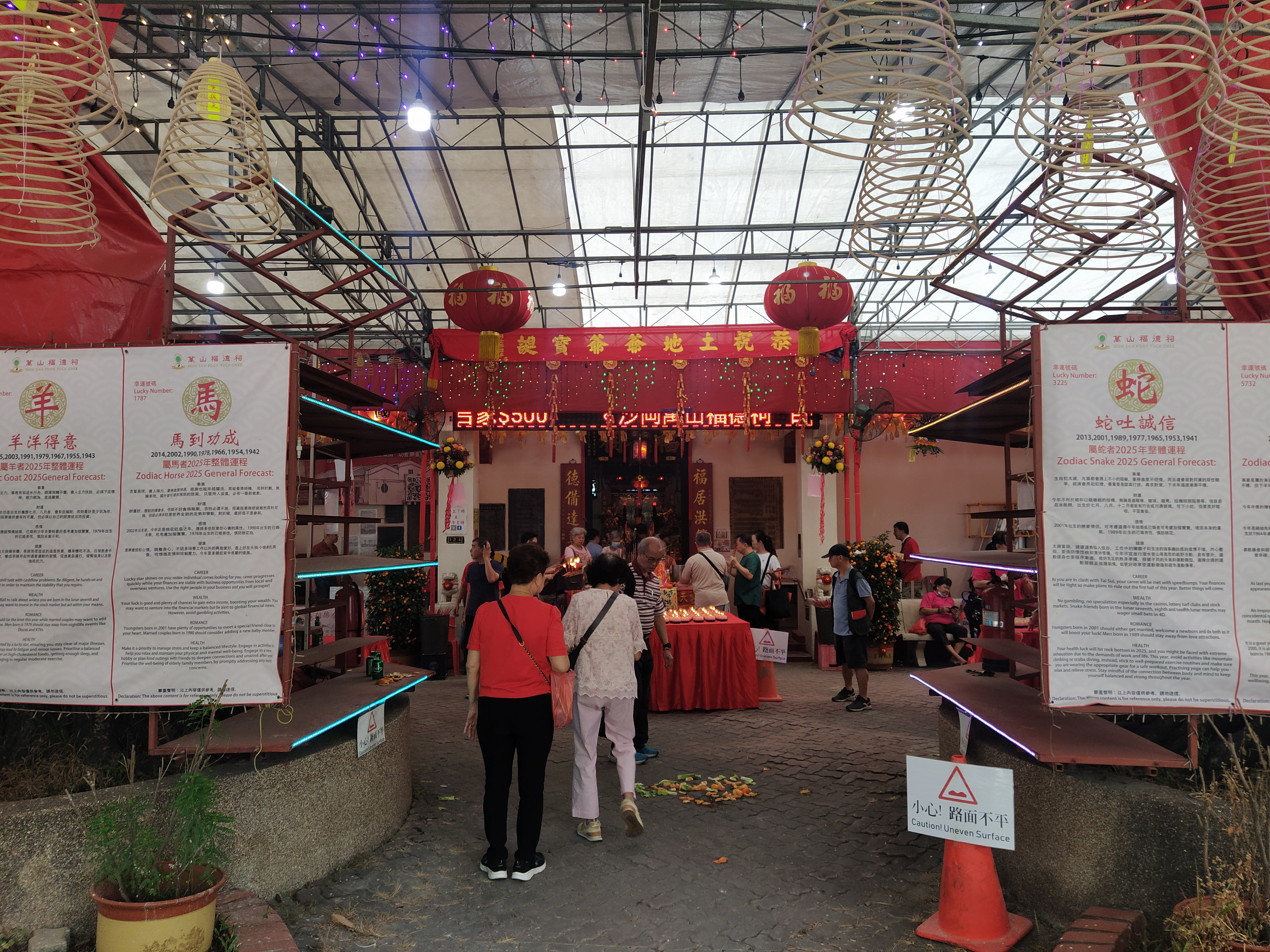

Monastery information
- Established: Early 1860s
- Reestablished: 1901

Architecture
- Style: Cantonese

Site
- Location: 124 Sims Drive Singapore 387379
- Country: Singapore
- Coordinates: 1.3183°N 103.8781°E

Sar Kong Mun San Fook Tuck Chee (Chinese: 沙岡萬山福德祠; pinyin: Shā Gāng Wàn Shān Fú Dé Cí) is a temple located around Kallang Basin in Singapore. It is one of the oldest Cantonese temples in Singapore, as well as the only one to host a fire dragon performance as part of its rituals. The temple performed societal functions before facing the threat of redevelopment in the 1960s, but eventually, managed to get the site to be preserved for heritage purposes.

== Etymology ==
Sar Kong was the name of the community living around the temple, while Mun San Kong was the former name for the Kallang Basin.

== History ==
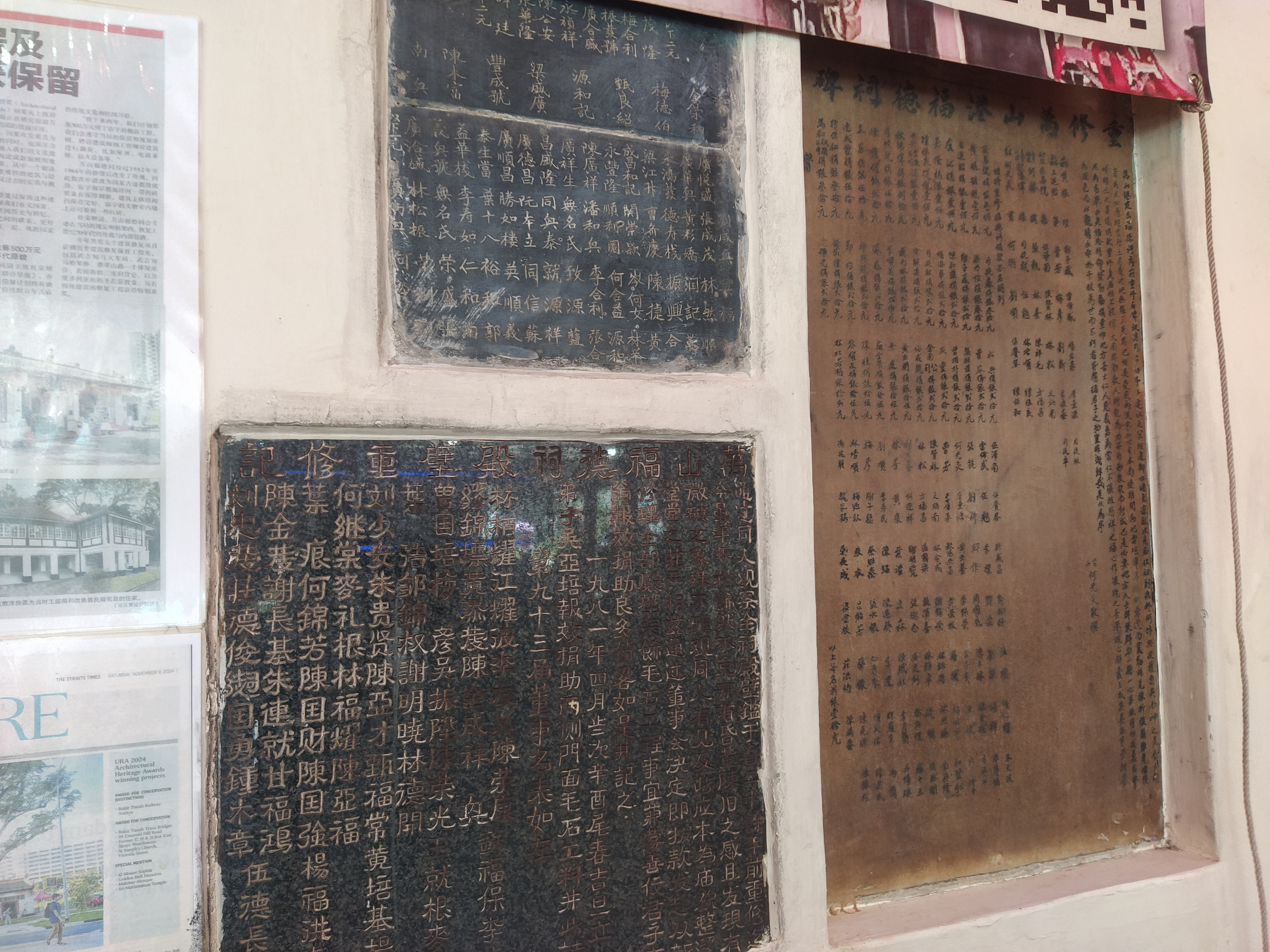
Temple inscriptions

The Mun San Fook Tuck Chee temple was established around the 1860s. While the exact date it was founded is unclear, a stone tablet found within the temple dates its relocation to its current location of 124 Sims Dr, Singapore 387379 in 1901. The temple recognizes itself as a Taoist temple, and has been a member of the Taoist Association of Singapore since 2007. It is one of the oldest Cantonese temples in Singapore

In the 1950s and 1960s, the villagers participated in the temple's events, and the temple's chairperson served as the village chief. The temple also set up social institutions, like the Sar Kong Fire Fighting Squad and Mong Yang Chinese School in accordance with the community's needs. Out of the institutions the temple set up, the Sar Kong Athletic Association still operates from the temple, practicing and promoting lion and dragon dance.

In 1963, the Singapore government started land reclamation around the Kallang Basin and straightening the Kallang River to make space for Housing Development Board flats. This resulted in the relocation of villagers around the area. In 1966, Singapore passed the Land Acquisition Act, allowing the government to purchase land for development purposes. Under this Act, in 1967, the land on which the temple stood was gazetted for acquisition and its owners were compensated, which meant that the temple no longer owned the land. In 1973, Tan Eng Liang, the Minister of State for National Development, stated in a policy statement that religious institutions from neighborhoods that were relocated would have to be given up for redevelopment. In 1979, the urban redevelopment plan reached the Sar Kong village, which resulted in the villagers from Sar Kong to be evicted and relocated to nearby HDB flats. This meant that the temple faced the issue of being redeveloped, since the neighborhood was relocated. The Mun San Fook Tuck Chee temple was eventually offered a 30-year lease for the land which its temple and main courtyard occupied.

Since the ending of the 30-year lease in 2009, the temple has been utilizing a yearly Temporary Occupational License. The Mun San Fook Tuck Chee temple's committee has been presenting the temple as a heritage site as a means to preserve it in the face of redevelopment, with a gallery and a guided tour of the temple. It also carried out fund-raising efforts to afford an office and extra floors to store urns. In 2024, National Development Minister Desmond Lee announced that the Urban Redevelopment Authority is planning to conserve the temple for its cultural and heritage practices as the start of Draft Master Plan 2025.

== Architecture ==
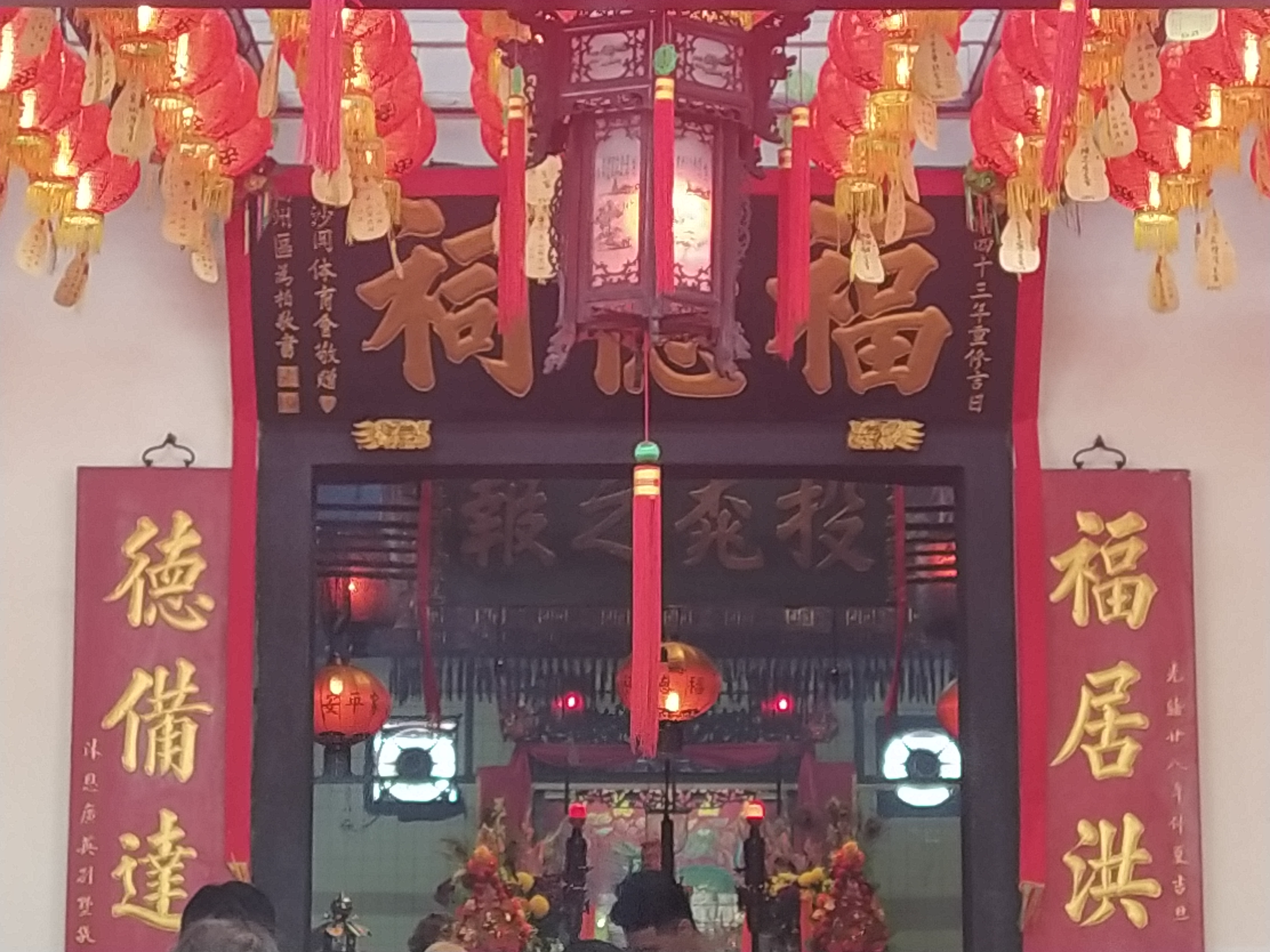
Entrance to the Temple

The Mun San Fook Tuck Chee temple follows a traditional Cantonese architecture style, characterized by a three-bay layout with three rows of halls. Each bay is split into subsections which include an entrance hall, an antechamber and a courtyard, with a main hall. The design is simplistic, with triple gable walls on either side. Like other Cantonese architecture, the temple has little decorative ornaments compared to other heritage temples. While repairs on the temple are evident, the signs of Cantonese architecture are still clearly visible.

== Worship ==
The main deity worshipped in the temple is Tudigong, the Earth god. Prayers are often offered before the usage of the kilns in the areas nearby as a sign of reverence to the god. The birthday celebrations of this deity, which falls on the second day of the second lunar month, is the main event that the temple hosts. The temple also houses other lesser-known deities, such as Jin Hua Fu Ren (金花夫人 or Kam Fa Leung Leung), a goddess of fertility and childbirth, as well as Hua Tuo, the patron deity of physicians.

== Activities ==
The temple hosts the fire dragon performance during certain rituals, such as the ones conducted on the birthday of Tudigong, the Earth god, which follows the Guangdong version, in which the dragon prop is made of hay and filled with incense sticks, as a form of cultural heritage. At the end of the ceremony, the dragon is left to burn up in a corner, symbolizing its rise to heaven. This ceremony is performed in this temple every three years, since the temple's 150th year anniversary in 2015, and is the only such performance in Singapore.
