= Spirit house =

Type of shrine found in Southeast Asia

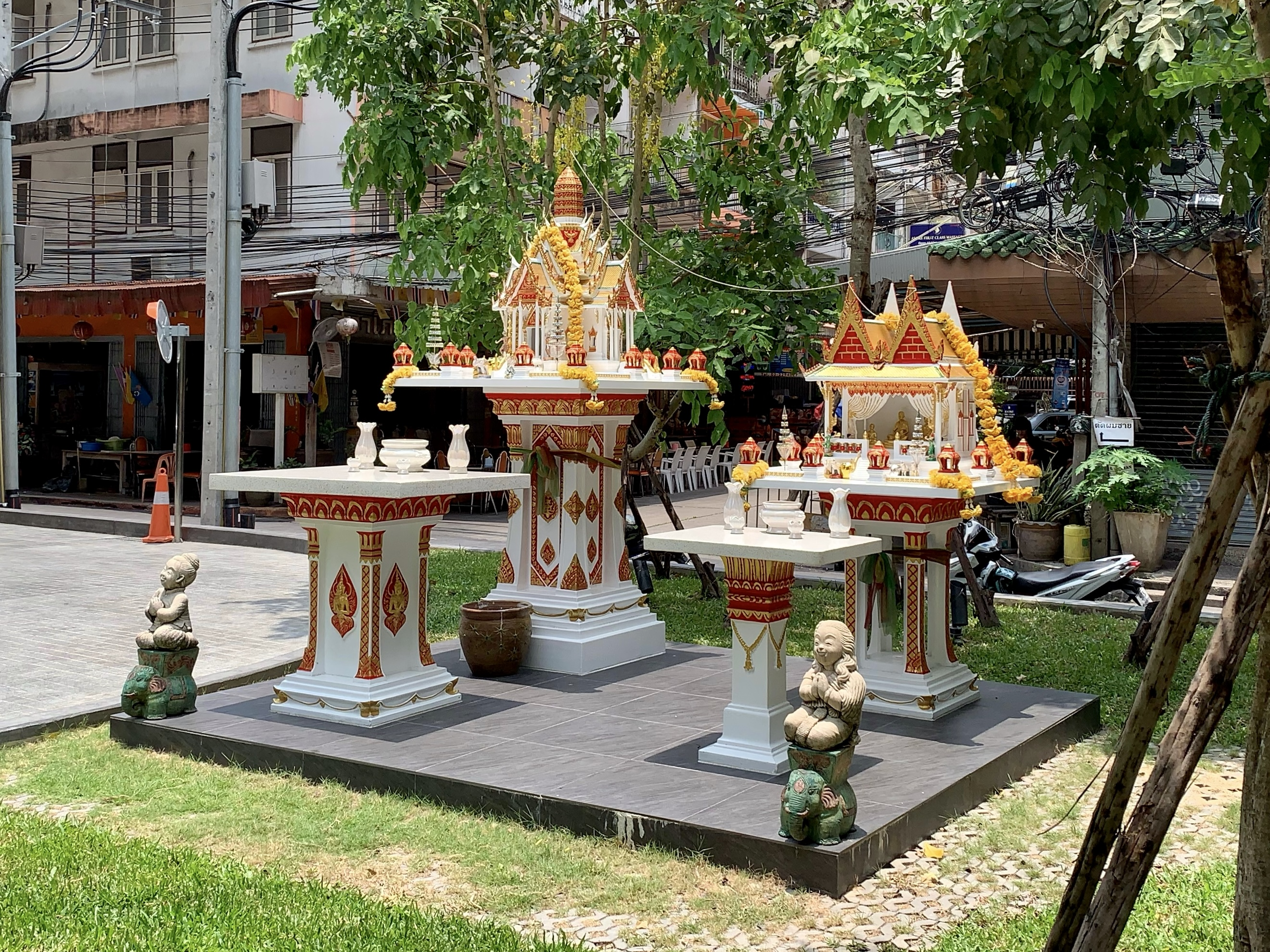
Spirit houses in Bangkok, Thailand; the two are a san phra phum (ศาลพระภูมิ, shrine of Phra Phum) on the left and a san chao thi (ศาลเจ้าที่; shrine for tutelary deity) on the right.

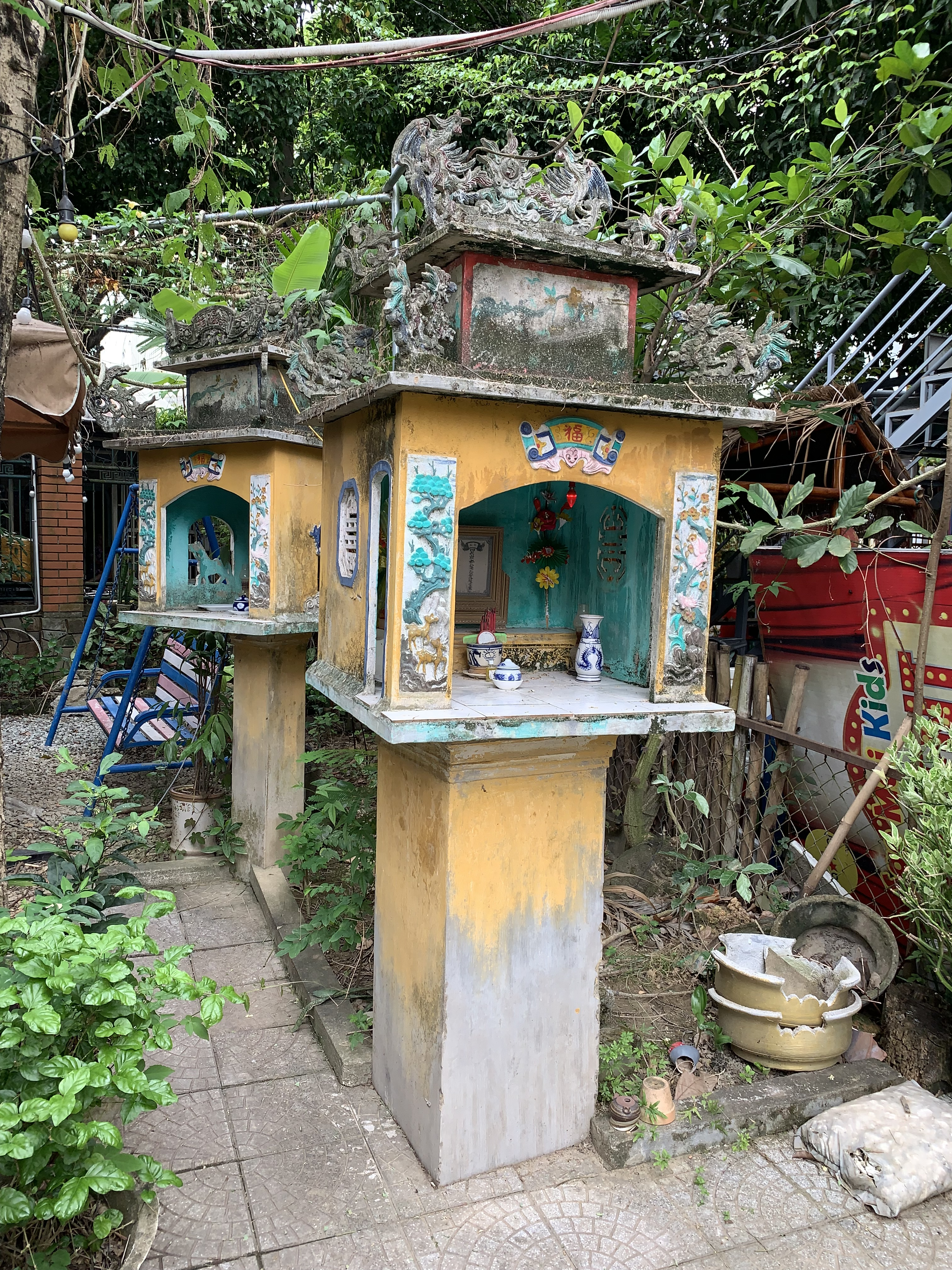
Spirit houses at a house in Huế, Vietnam

A spirit house is a shrine to the protective spirit of a place that is found in the Southeast Asian countries of Cambodia, Laos, Thailand, Malaysia, Myanmar, Indonesia, Vietnam and the Philippines. They are normally in the form of small roofed structure mounted on a pillar or a dais, and can range in size from small platforms to houses large enough for people to enter. Spirit houses are intended to provide a shelter for spirits that could cause problems for the people if not appeased. They often include images or carved statues of people and animals. Votive offerings are left at them to propitiate the spirits; more elaborate installations include an altar for this purpose.

== Regional traditions ==
=== Southeast Asia ===
In mainland Southeast Asia, most houses and businesses have a spirit house placed in an auspicious spot, most often in a corner of the property. The location may be chosen after consultation with a Brahmin priest. Spirit houses are known as နတ်စင် (nat sin) or နတ်ကွန်း (nat kun) in Burmese; ศาลพระภูมิ (san phra phum, 'house of the guardian spirit') in Thai; and រានព្រះភូមិ (rean preah phum, 'shrine for the guardian-spirit') or រានទេវតា (rean taveda) in Khmer.

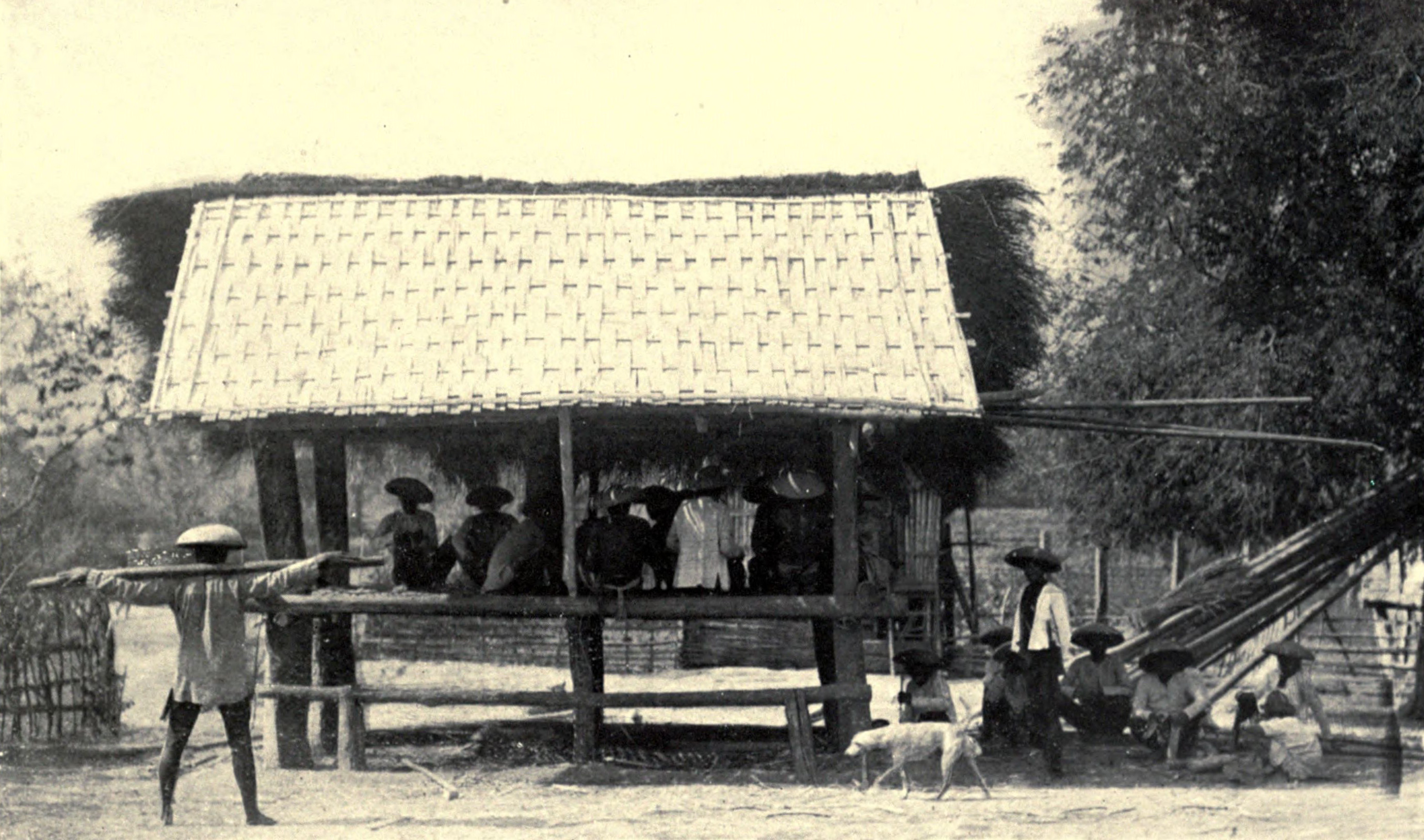
Balaua, the largest spirit house for anito among the Itneg people (1922, Philippines)

In maritime Southeast Asia, spirit houses are connected to the various traditional animistic rituals involving spirits. In the Philippines, spirit houses are dedicated to ceremonies or offerings involving the anito spirits. They are also referred to as shrines. They are known magdantang in Visayan; ulango or simbahan in Tagalog; tangpap, pangkew, or alalot (for various small roofed altars), and balaua or kalangan (for larger structures) in Itneg; maligai in Subanen; tenin in Tiruray; and buis (for those built near roads and villages) and parabunnian (for those built near rice fields) in Bagobo.

==== Thailand ====
A spirit house (Thai: ศาลพระภูมิ, RTGS: san phra phum) is a small shrine dedicated to the guardian deity of a plot of land. Such shrines are found at homes and businesses throughout Thailand. Most traditional examples are miniature buildings raised on a single pillar, with incense, garlands and figurines placed in front of them.

Beliefs associated with spirit houses draw on older forms of spirit worship, Brahmanic-Hindu practices and Buddhism. Installation usually involves a ceremony in which Buddhist monks and Brahmins take part. Households make offerings in the belief that the deity will continue to protect the land. In densely built-up areas, spirit houses may be placed on balconies, rooftops or in alleys.

===== Beliefs and background =====
====== Layers of belief ======
Spirit houses developed within a set of beliefs that overlapped over time rather than belonging to a single religion. Early communities turned to spirits for protection and to explain natural dangers. They performed rituals and made offerings in the hope of keeping these forces calm. Buddhist teachings focus on states of mind, a feature that allowed Buddhism to coexist with nature worship and Brahmanic-Hindu rituals.

This combination is often described as Thai popular Buddhism. It brings together everyday practices associated with spirit worship, folk Brahmanism, Chinese deities and state-sponsored Theravada Buddhism. Many Thai Buddhists see no conflict between these practices and pay respect to both the Buddha and spirits.

====== Spirits and guardian deities ======
Thai beliefs distinguish between helpful spirits, which assist those who seek their help, and harmful spirits, which are associated with illness and death. Guardian spirits of villages and towns are regarded as helpful. Shrines provide places where people can make offerings and vows to them. Under Brahmanic-Hindu influence, some nature spirits came to be regarded as thep (Thai: เทพ, "deities") and were given the title phra (Thai: พระ). Both terms derive from Sanskrit, and the name Phra Phum includes this title.

====== Phra Phum and Chao Thi ======
The word phum (Thai: ภูมิ) means "land", so Phra Phum (Thai: พระภูมิ) refers to a deity who protects a particular plot of land. Phra Phum and Chao Thi (Thai: เจ้าที่) are understood as different types of guardian. Chao Thi is associated with the ground itself, whereas Phra Phum is represented in a raised shrine. Offerings also differ. In the eastern provinces and in some Thai-Chinese households, families may keep two separate shrines, offering vegetarian food to Phra Phum and meat and liquor to Chao Thi.

===== History =====
Buddhism reached the region during the Dvaravati period. Brahmanic-Hindu beliefs also came from India and became part of local Buddhist practices, while older beliefs in spirits continued. Inscriptions from the Sukhothai period are reported to mention rituals and offerings made to ask spirits to protect the city. During the Ayutthaya period, kings supported royal ceremonies that brought together Buddhist, Brahmanic and local traditions.

Over time, Phra Phum largely took the place of the traditional household spirit (Thai: ผีเรือน, RTGS: phi ruean; also ผีบ้าน, phi ban). Shrines dedicated to Phra Phum remain common at homes and businesses. According to tradition, a house is considered incomplete without a spirit house, so a Brahmin or another knowledgeable person is invited to perform the installation ceremony.

===== Architecture and types =====
====== Form and structure ======
A traditional spirit house is usually a small wooden building with a Thai-style roof, raised on a single pillar. Modern versions are often made of cement and shaped like miniature palaces. A shrine generally has three main parts: the pillar, a base or tray, and the building itself. Similar designs have also been reported in Laos and Cambodia.

====== Types of shrine ======
One classification groups Thai shrines into three categories: shrines for nature spirits, shrines for grandparents or ancestors (Thai: ศาลตายาย, RTGS: san ta yai), and spirit houses (san phra phum). The single pillar is a common feature used to distinguish the san phra phum from the san chao thi (Thai: ศาลเจ้าที่), or land-spirit shrine. However, descriptions of the san chao thi differ between sources. One describes it as a four-posted structure resembling a small house, often with a stairway, reflecting the belief that Chao Thi lives directly on the land. Another describes a lower, six-pillared shrine placed beside the san phra phum in the same compound. In Chiang Rai, Lanna invocation texts describe the Phra Phum shrine as higher than the Chao Thi shrine, a practice associated with that region.

Village guardian shrines form a separate category. At Ban Khlong Nong Ngu Hao, for example, three shrines were first built as small, single-pillar wooden structures in the Thai style. They were later rebuilt as larger, four-pillar buildings that visitors can enter.

====== Architectural styles ======
A field survey in Bang Rak, Bangkok, identified eight main styles of spirit house. The most frequently recorded was the four-porch design with a prang (Thai: ปรางค์) spire, accounting for 43% of the examples. The single-prang style accounted for 19%, followed by the ordination-hall style (12%), the Thai-house style (10%) and the four-porch design with a castle-style spire (9%). Other common designs reproduce the forms of Thai houses, palaces, pavilions, ordination halls, temples and prang, but on a smaller scale and raised on a single pillar.

====== Location and orientation ======
Traditional guidance regards the area around a spirit house as sacred ground and recommends placing it outside the shadow of the main house. Thai house-building manuals also advise setting the shrine on ground separate from the house and away from toilets, the front door and property boundaries. These texts identify the northeast as the most auspicious direction, followed by the east and southeast, and advise against a west- or south-facing shrine. In older Thai settlements, spirit shrines were generally built outside temple grounds, and anyone could erect one.

The Bang Rak survey gives a picture of shrine locations in an urban setting. It found that 60% stood along streets, lanes and alleys; 27% were in front of buildings, 8% on balconies or rooftops, and 4% beside buildings.

===== Rituals and offerings =====
====== Meaning of worship ======
From a Buddhist perspective, worship of Phra Phum expresses gratitude to the deities believed to protect the land. It also reminds the four assemblies of Buddhists to remain mindful and to follow the good conduct of those deities. In this belief, a household that neglects its offerings may face illness or misfortune as a result.

====== Installation ======
A spirit house is commonly installed when a new home is built or when people move to another residence. The ceremony is intended to clear away inauspicious influences before inviting Phra Phum to protect the owner and household. It forms part of a wider set of house-building rituals. These may include selecting an auspicious time through astrology, chanting, checking the position of the Naga (Thai: พญานาค, RTGS: phaya nak), paying respect to King Phalee (Thai: เจ้ากรุงพาลี, RTGS: chao krung phali), and making offerings to Phra Phum.

During the installation, a ritual specialist selects an auspicious date and time, decides where the shrine will stand and which direction it will face, and arranges for the pillar's foundation to be prepared. Preparations begin the previous day, while the ceremony itself takes about an hour. The altar table is covered with a white cloth and set with offerings, incense and candles; a three-coloured cloth is also prepared. At the appointed time, a standing wooden figure of a deity, called a chawet (Thai: เจว็ด), is placed inside the shrine to represent Phra Phum. Offerings are then presented, and the three-coloured cloth is tied around the pillar.

The ceremony often brings together Buddhist and Brahmanic practices: monks chant to invite the deity, while Brahmins present the offerings. Some opening ceremonies include chants by nine monks. The number nine is considered auspicious because the Thai word for nine (Thai: เก้า, RTGS: kao) sounds similar to the word for "progress" (Thai: ก้าวหน้า, RTGS: kao na).

====== Ritual texts and invocations ======
Traditional house-building manuals describe more than one way to honour Phra Phum. Some recommend preparing offering cards (Thai: บัตรพลี, RTGS: bat phli); others mention reciting incantations when setting up the shrine or asking a specialist to prepare holy water. These practices are intended to bring good fortune and prosperity to the household. In the Lanna tradition, an invocation invites the local land guardian to reside in a prepared place, such as a temporary ritual pavilion (Thai: ศาลเพียงตา, RTGS: san phiang ta) or a permanent shrine, to protect the house and its grounds.

====== Offerings ======
After the shrine has been installed, households continue to make offerings to Phra Phum. Decorations commonly include small figures of male and female attendants, elephants and horses, as well as a yellow cloth for the chawet, curtains, flower vases, candles and incense. Worshippers may also place fresh garlands, dancing figures and statues of a deity holding a money bag and a sword at the shrine.

===== Modern and urban context =====
====== Shrines in the city ======
Shrines are a familiar feature of Bangkok's commercial areas. At the Ratchaprasong intersection, for example, shrines dedicated to Erawan Brahma, the Trimurti and Ganesha stand outside a hotel and a shopping centre, where worshippers regularly leave offerings. When one building installs a shrine for protection against spirits, nearby businesses often establish shrines of their own.

The Erawan Shrine is a well-known case associated with this practice. During construction of the Erawan Hotel in the 1950s, repeated accidents continued despite the use of conventional spirit houses. A shrine to Brahma, rather than a spirit house, was then built.

====== Limited and shared space ======
In densely built-up areas, limited land has changed where shrines are placed. Those once set on the ground within residential compounds may now be found on balconies and rooftops, or in shared spaces such as alleys and lanes. Bang Rak, a central commercial district of Bangkok with a long history of multicultural settlement, has been studied as an example of this change. A survey there identified five types of small sacred site: spirit houses, Chao Thi shrines, sacred trees, Chinese shrines and Brahma shrines.

The district's different communities sometimes share the same compound. As a result, some Thai spirit houses stand beside Chinese shrines to the Heaven and Earth deities or near paper-burning furnaces. At one Thai-Chinese clan association, a Chinese land deity known as Chao Di was placed inside a Thai spirit house. Although these shrines are part of everyday urban life, heritage conservation programmes often give greater attention to large religious buildings.

====== Condominiums and digital media ======
A design study of Thai residents aged 25 to 35 who lived in condominiums and townhouses found that most continued to respect sacred beings. However, many viewed traditional spirit houses as difficult to accommodate in small living spaces and unsuited to modern routines. In response, the researchers designed a compact shrine using augmented reality (AR) to explain the meaning of the ritual, rather than to replace a physical shrine. Of the 40 participants who tested the prototype, 85% rated their sense of connection to the ritual tradition as 4 or 5 on a five-point scale.

=== East Asia ===
In Chinese, spirit houses are called 土地神屋 or Tudigong Houses, representing a link between the concept and the concept of an Earth Temple dedicated to a dizhu shen or a Tudigong.

=== South Asia ===
In Tamil Nadu, spirit houses and shrines house local tutelary spirits, guardian deities, and deified ancestors who derive from ancient Dravidian animistic beliefs. They tend to be located on the periphery of villages, known as the "katu," due to the belief that these spirits are "too dangerous and unpredictable to [have] reside in the village... and seem to be disturbed by the sounds of village life." Many of these spirit houses are dedicated to the spirit of a deified hero, especially— Madurai Veeran, Karuppuswami, or Aiyanar. Offerings of bananas, coconuts, oil lamps, meat, and alcohol are routinely left at these shrines to ensure the health and safety of the village. This starkly contrasts the Vedic Hindu practice of only offering vegetarian foods to deities. As a result of countless Tamils falling into the British Raj's indenture system, these shrines have spread throughout the Indian diaspora.

In Kerala, each family home complex (for Nairs and Ezhavas), known as a tharavadu, has a spirit house located towards the northeast corner. Known as "kavu" or "sarpa kavukal," these shrines consist of a small grove with symbolic houses and carved stone effigies of guardian nagas, and other "gods, spirits, yakshi, [or] ancestors." The Malayali people traditionally believe that the construction and maintenance of these sacred shrines keeps tutelary spirits docile and can even serve as atonement for "angry serpent gods [who were]... left unattended." Spirits of the kavu are most commonly offered "raw rice, unbroken coconut fruits, betel leaves, and areca nut," as well as an "oil lamp in front of the deity at dusk." Occasionally, these kavu serve as locations for shamanistic rituals known as "pampin kalam" where mediums channel the deities and perform sacred rites around hand-drawn mandalas made from coloured powder.

== Spirit house offerings ==
In Cambodia, the most common offering are fruits (e.g. banana, orange, grape; some people even offer different fruits at the same time.) In neighbouring Thailand however, it is a long-standing tradition to leave offerings of food and drink at the spirit house. Rice, bananas, coconuts, and desserts are common offerings. Most ubiquitous is red, strawberry-flavoured Fanta. The idea seems to be that friendly spirits will congregate to enjoy free food and drink and their presence will serve to keep more malign spirits at bay. The popularity of red Fanta offerings has existed for decades. Opinions as to "why Fanta?" vary. Most point to the significance of the colour red, reminiscent of animal sacrifice, or perhaps related to the practice of anchoring red incense sticks in a glass of water which promptly tints the water red. Sweetness is explained by the observation that sweet spirits naturally have sweet tooths.

== Parts ==
Parts of spirit houses include

1. A raised pedestal base
2. A roof
3. An altar
4. Sacred objects inside such as buddha statues

== Gallery ==
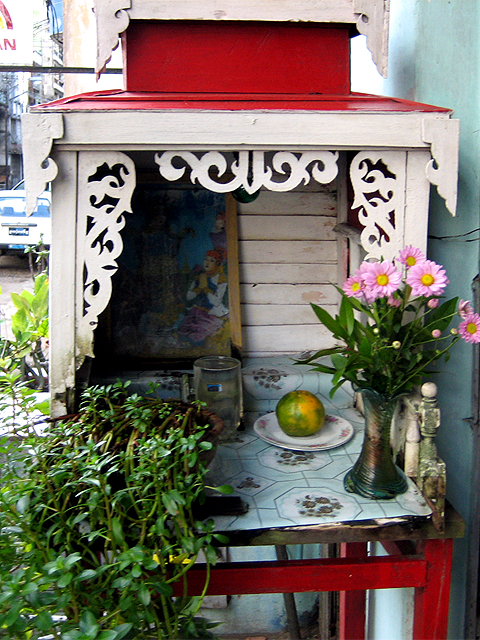
Spirit house, Yangon

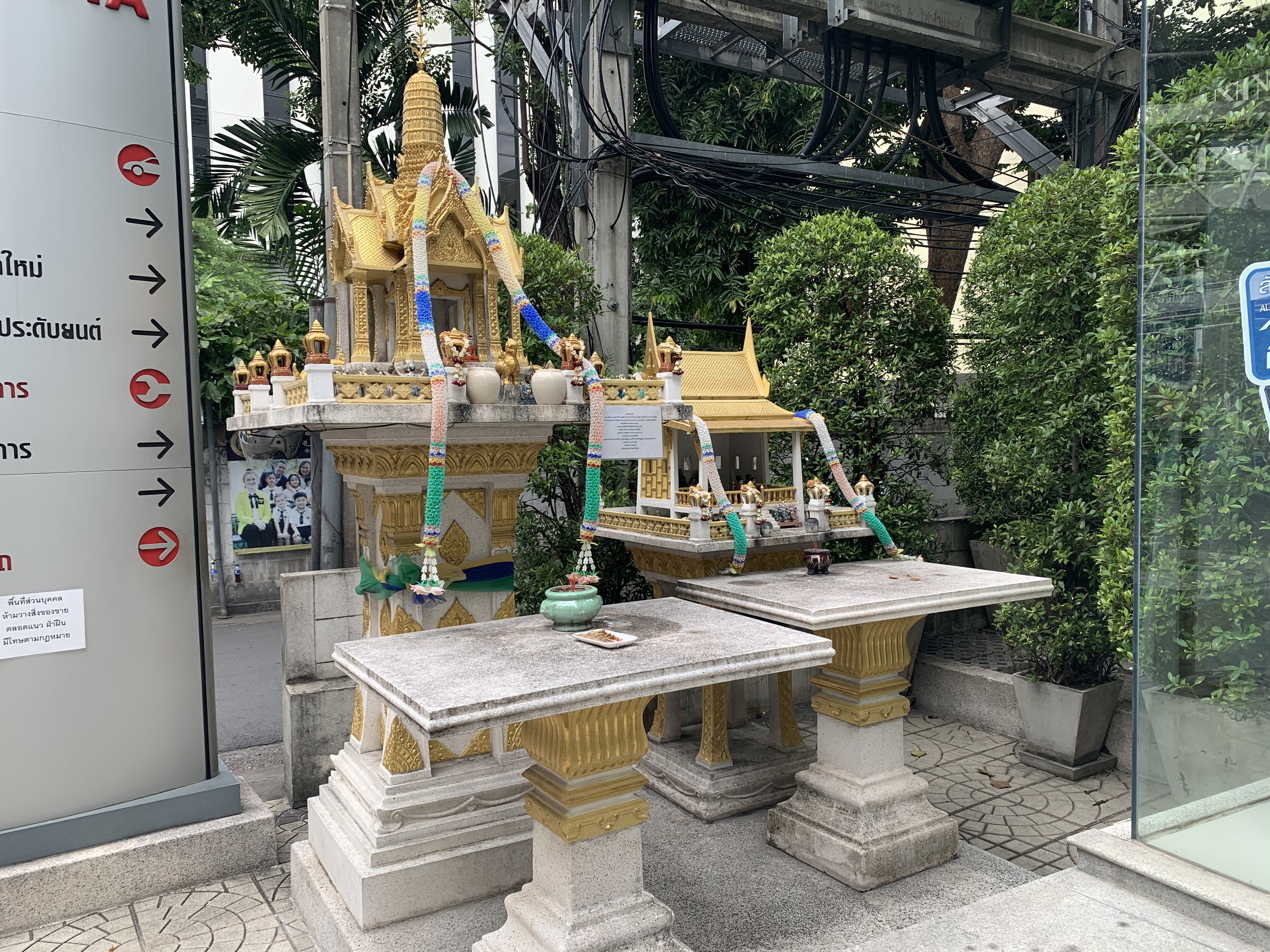
Spirit house, Bangkok

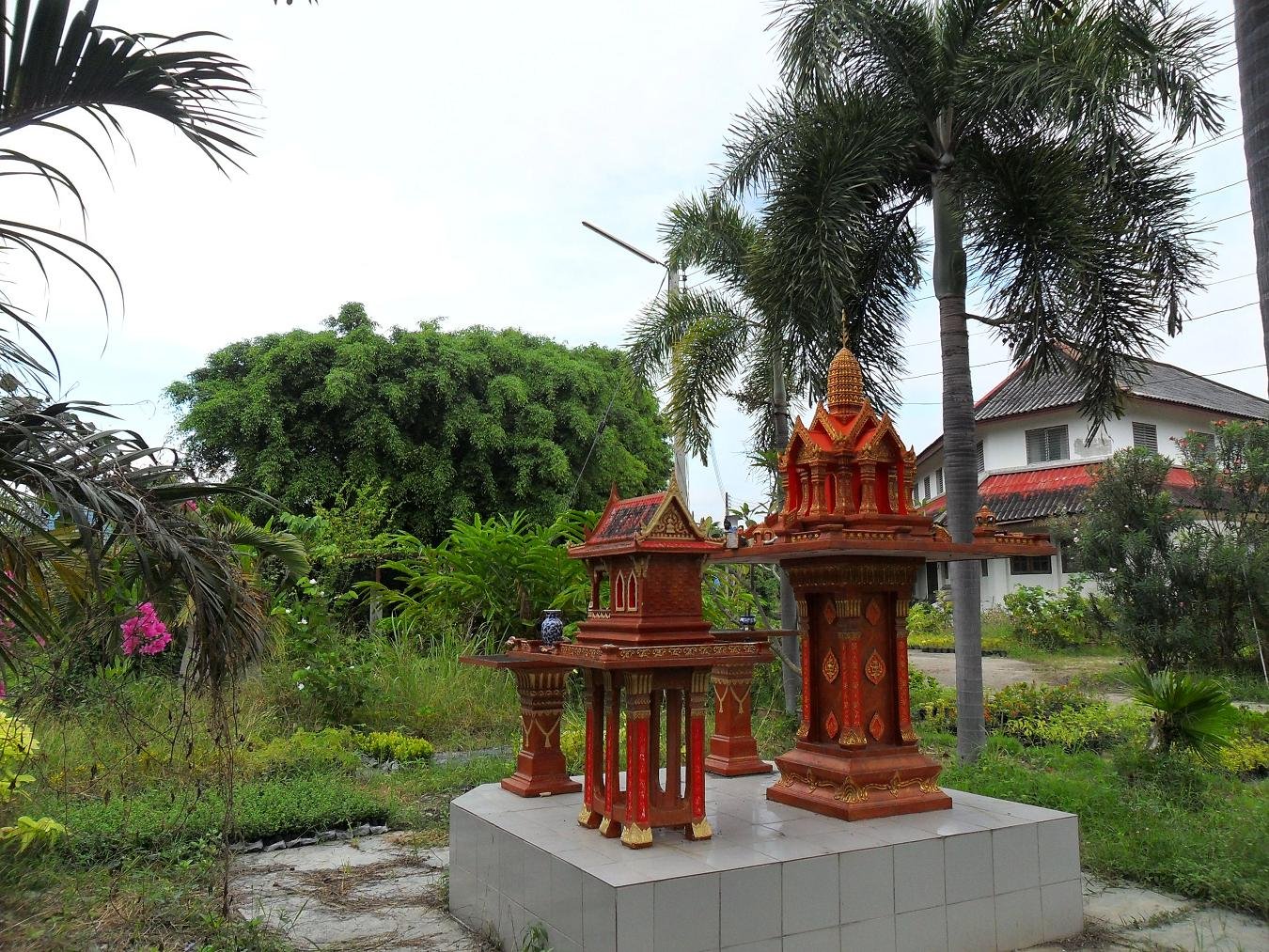
Spirit houses at a private house, Phetchaburi, Thailand

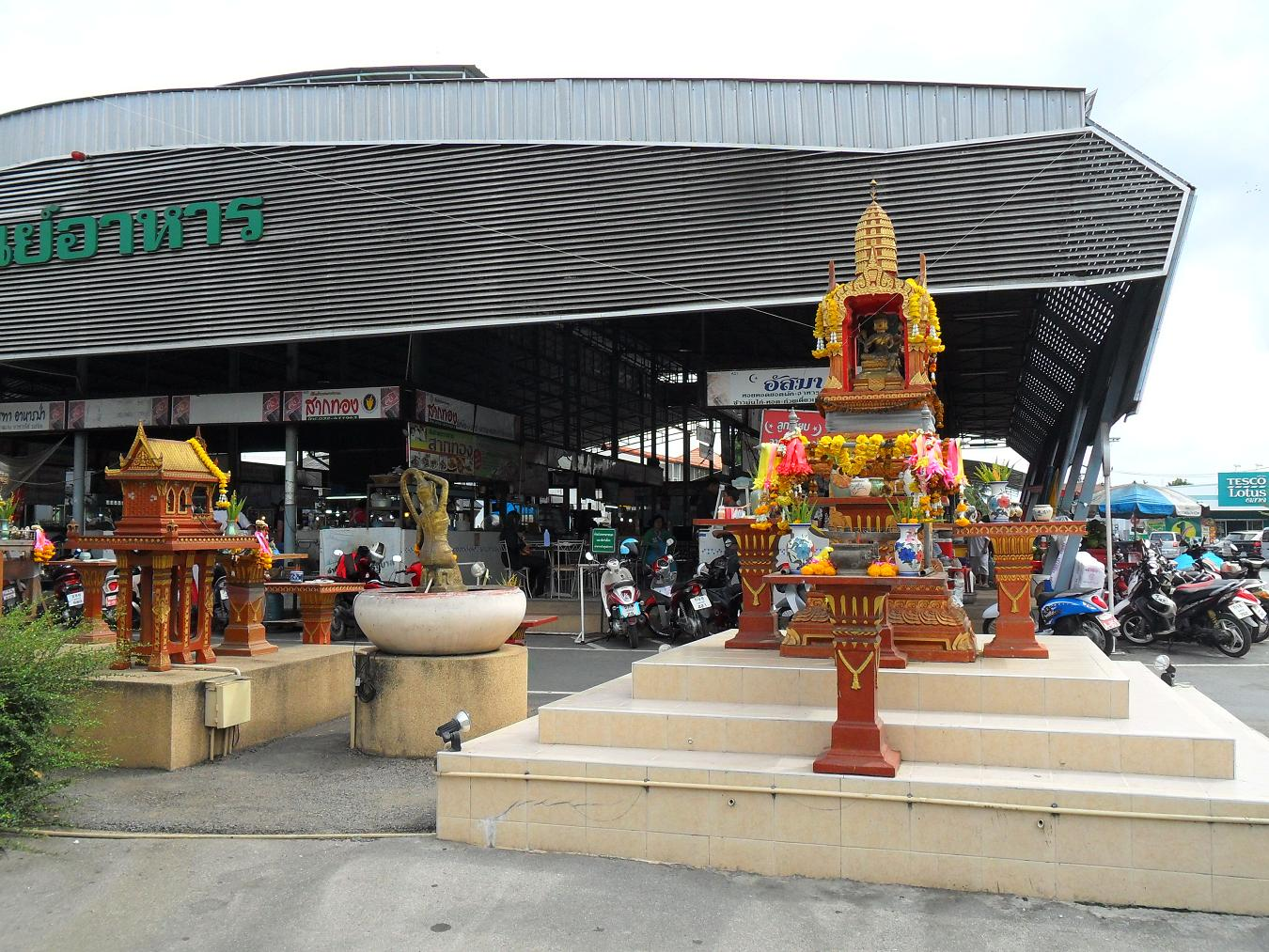
Spirit houses protect a business, Thailand

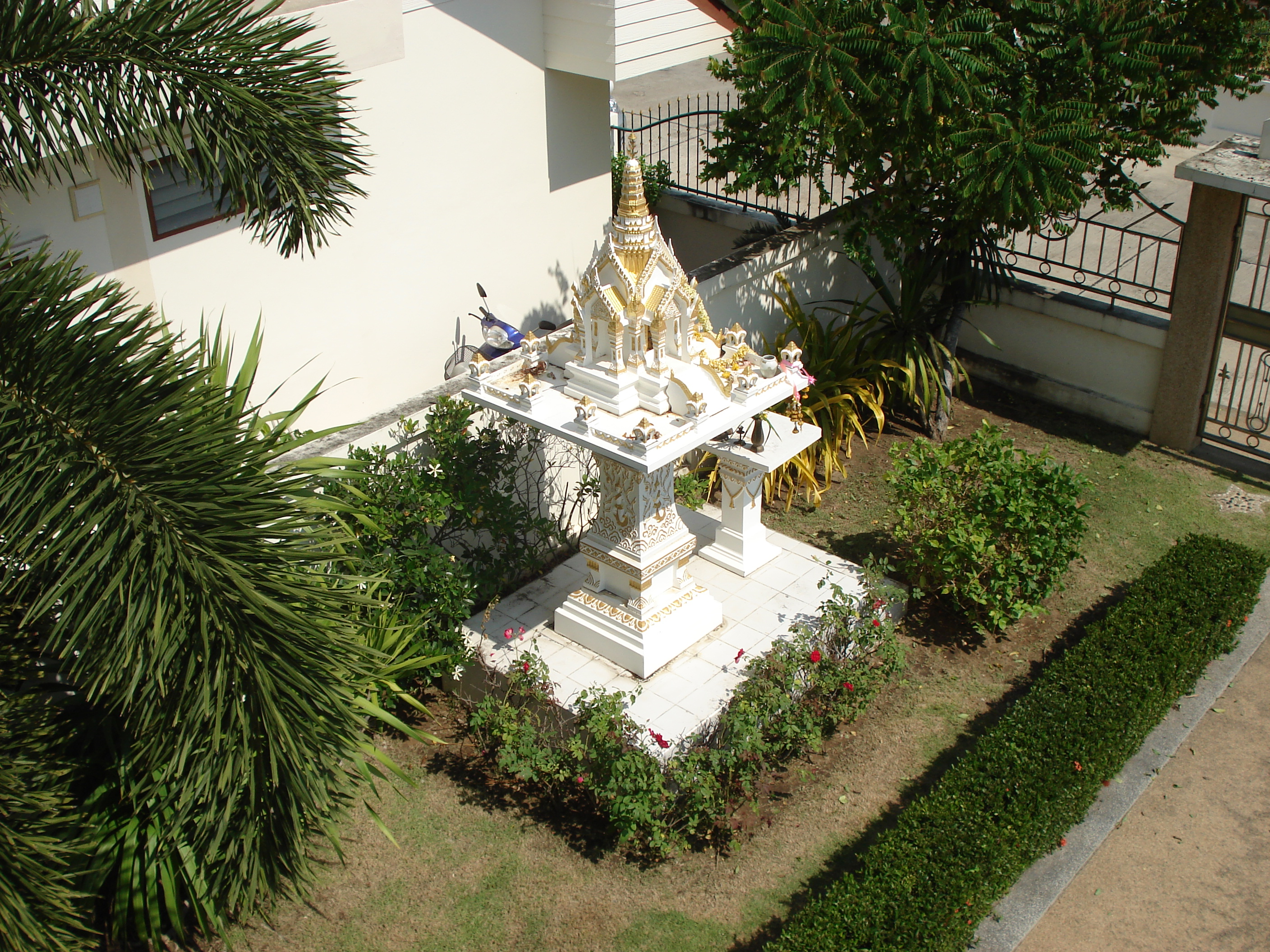
Spirit house, Hua Hin

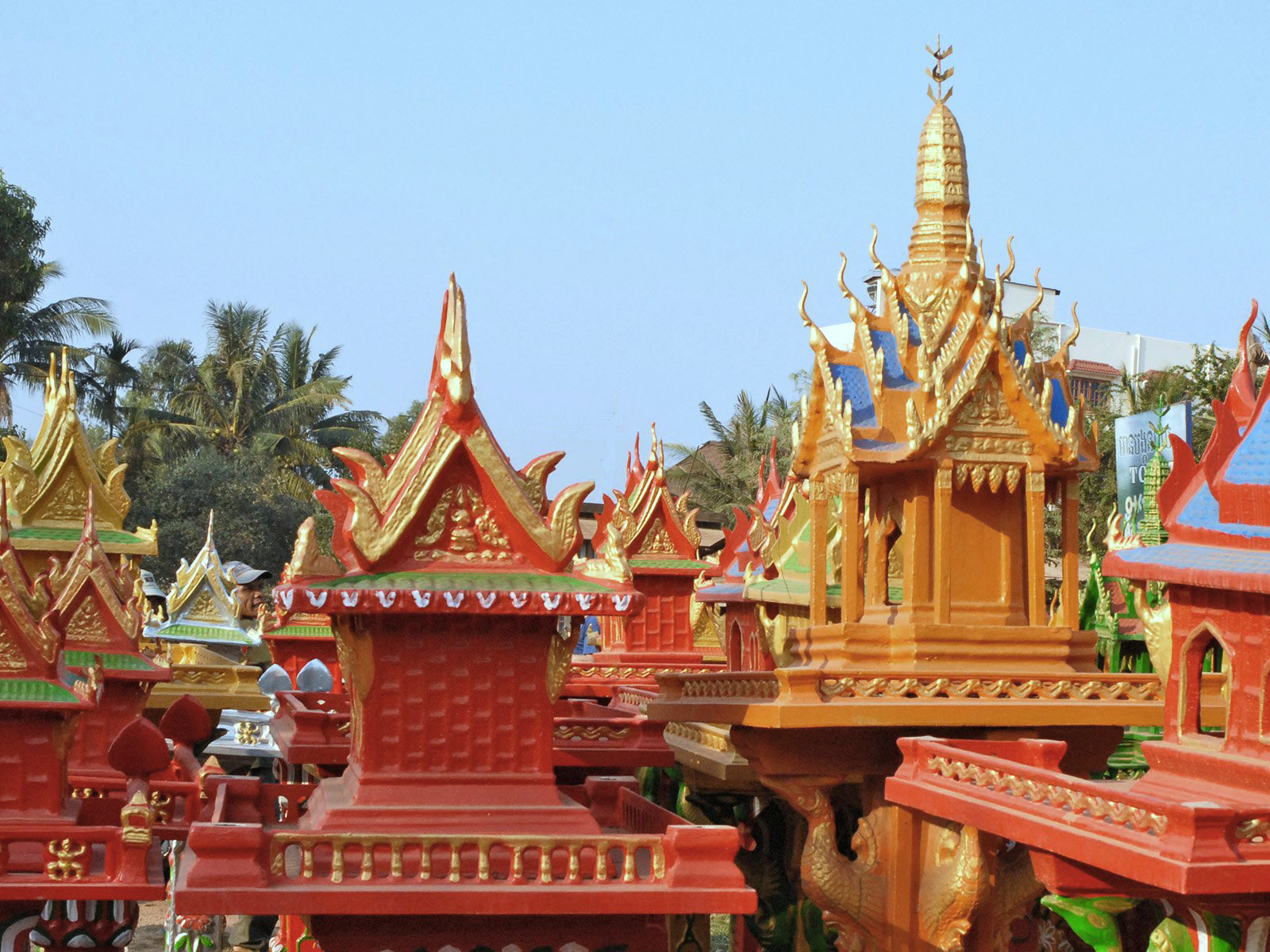
Cambodian-style spirit houses.

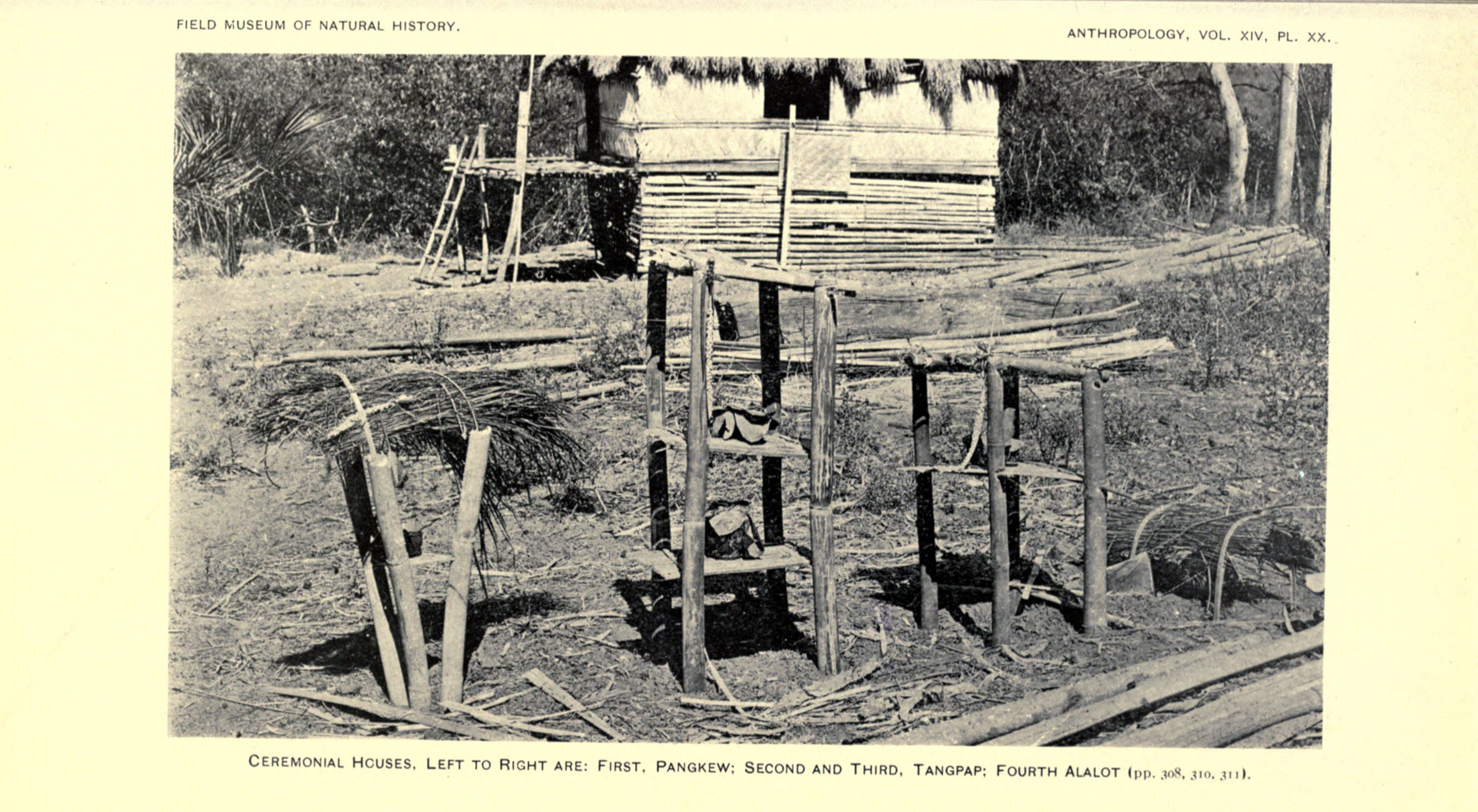
Ceremonial spirit houses among the Itneg (left to right) the pangkew, two tangpap, and an alalot (1922, Philippines)

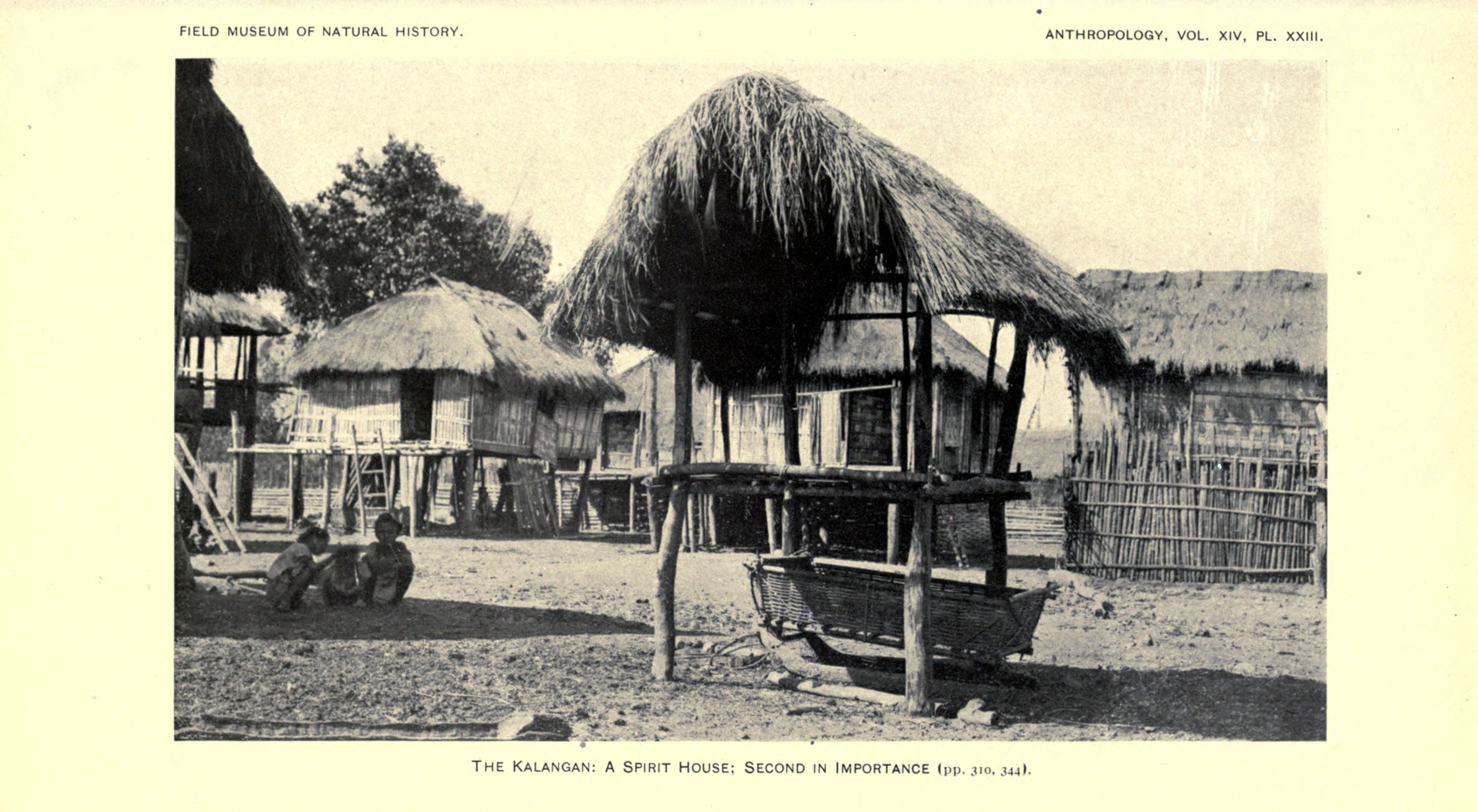
Kalangan spirit house, Itneg people (1922, Philippines)

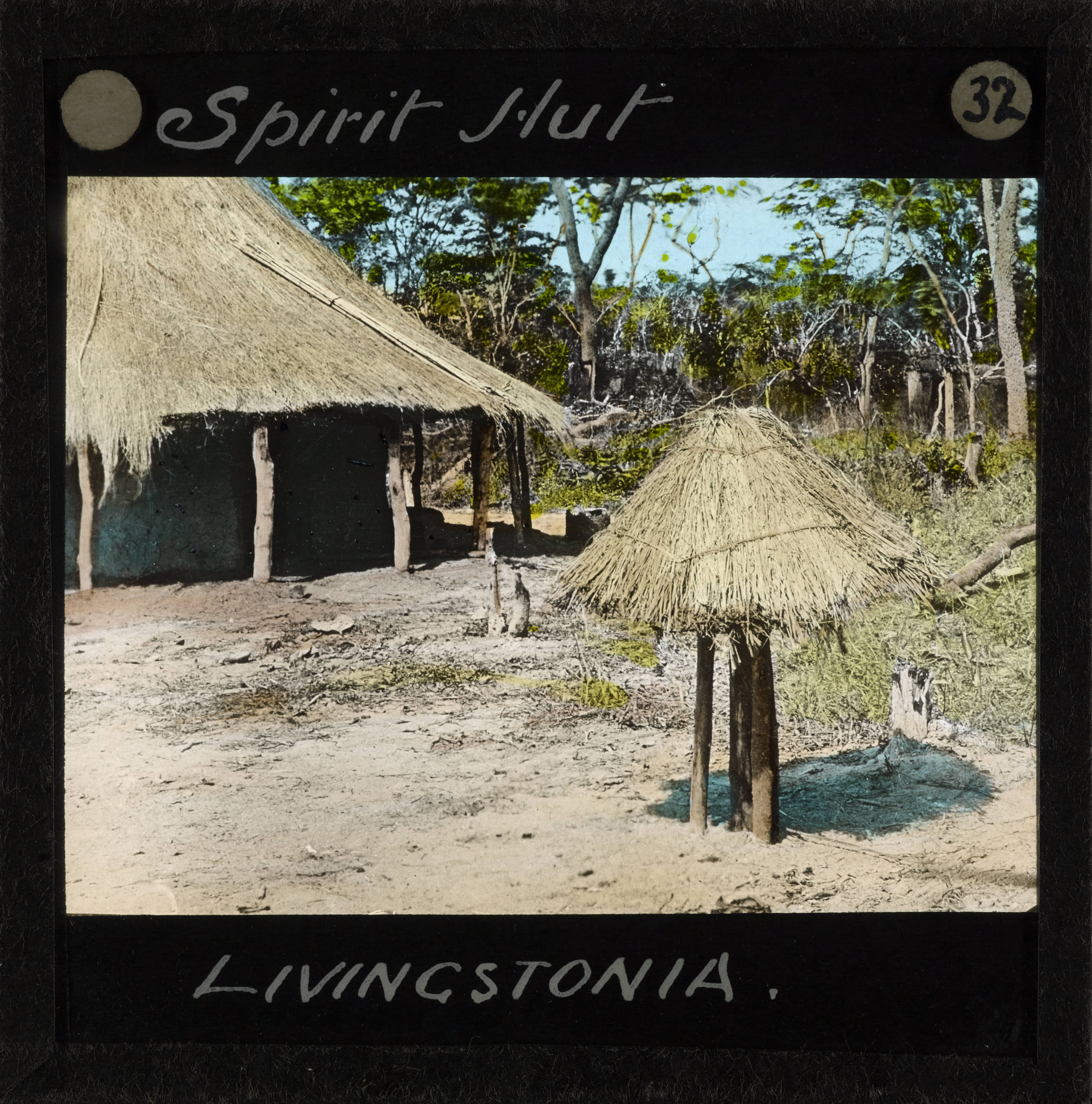
A spirit house in Livingstonia, Malawi (c. 1910)

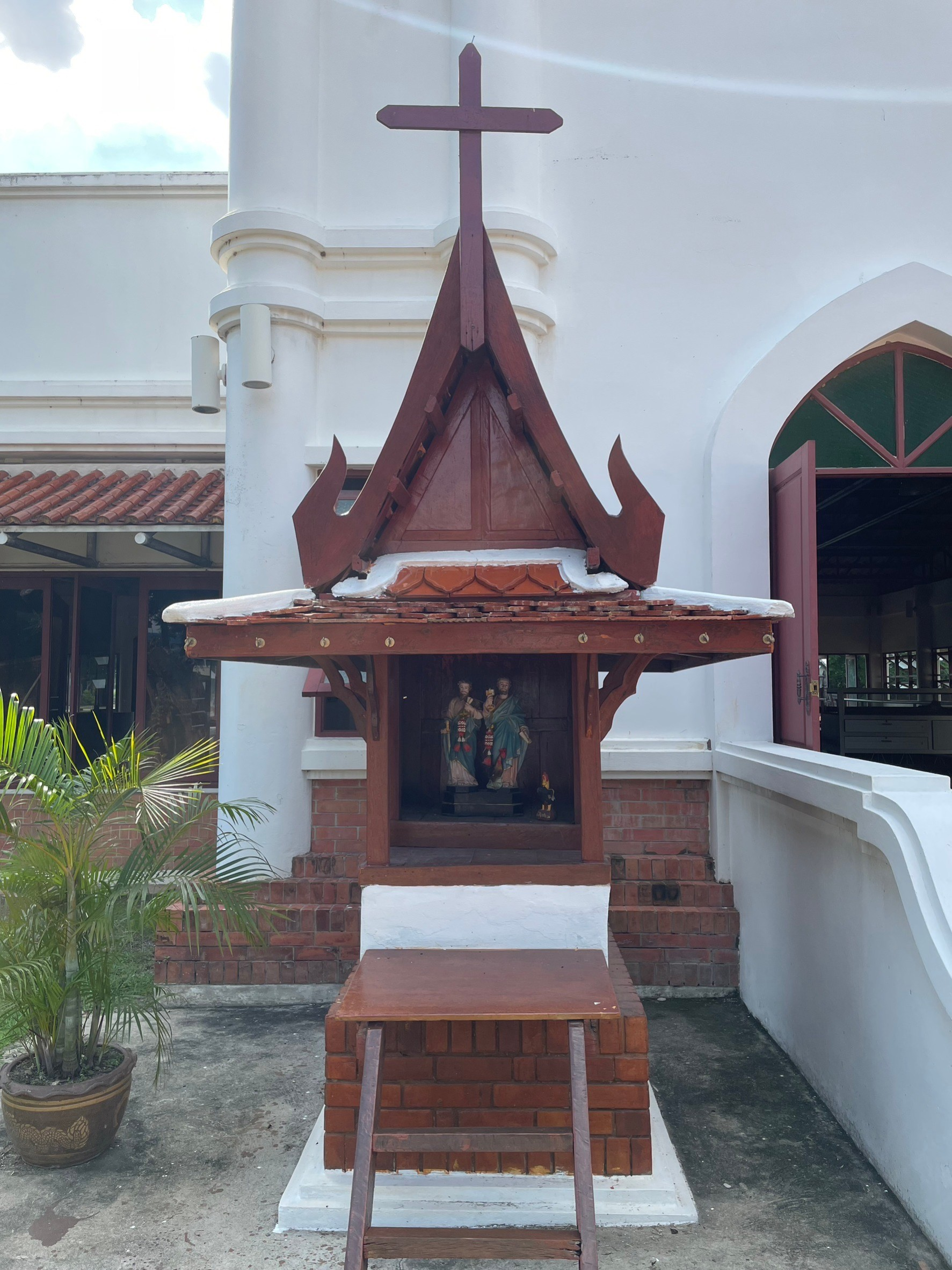
A Shrine of Peter and Paul, Ayutthaya, Thailand

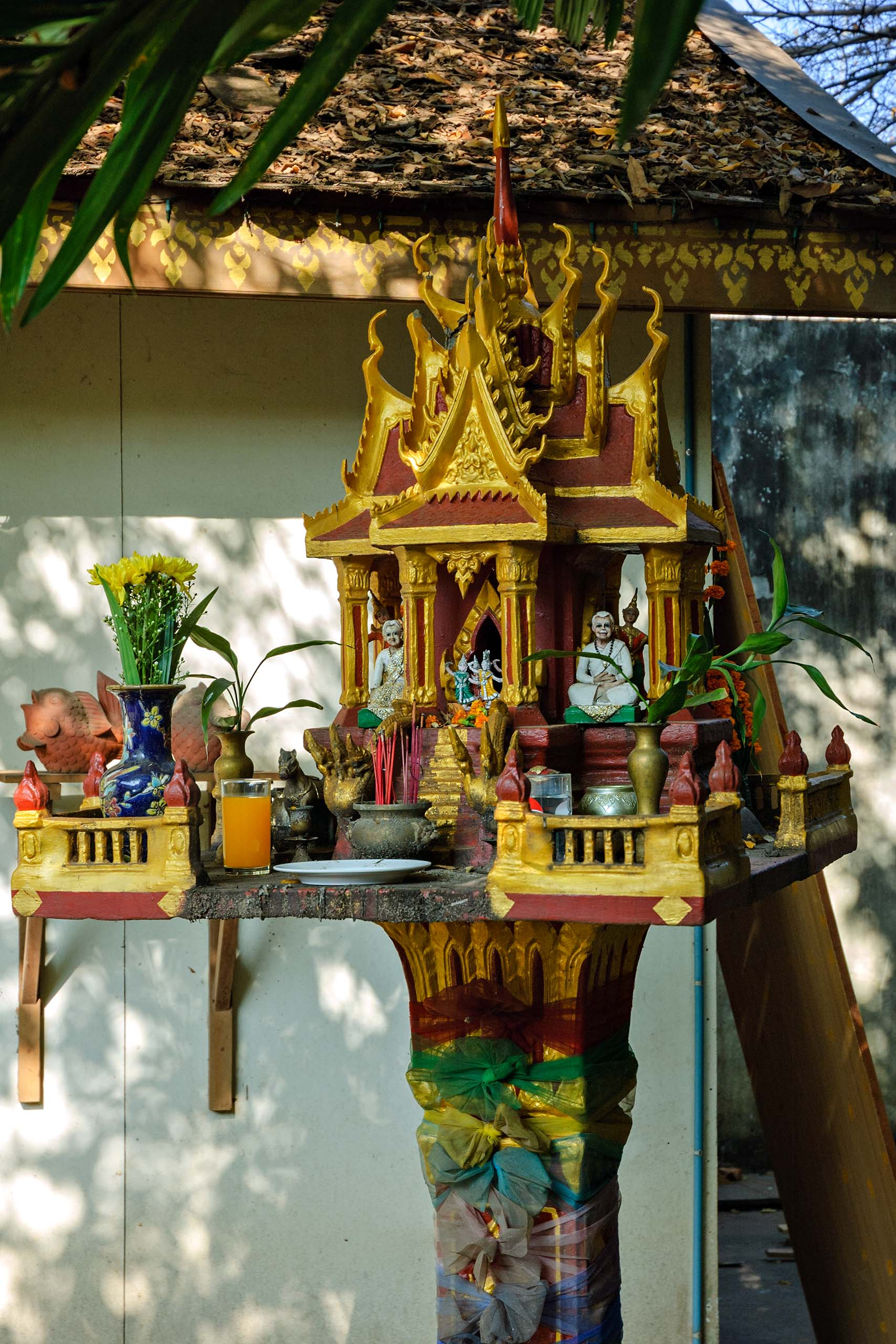
Spirit house miniature temple with ancestor figures, Vientiane, Laos

Dayak spirit house in Central Kalimantan, Indonesia

== See also ==
- Anito
- Di Penates
- Erawan Shrine
- Genius loci
- Hokora
- Lak Mueang
- Lares
- Nat (spirit)
- Phra Phrom
- Thai folklore
- Tutelary deity
- Yorishiro
