= Dizhu shen =

Chinese folk deities

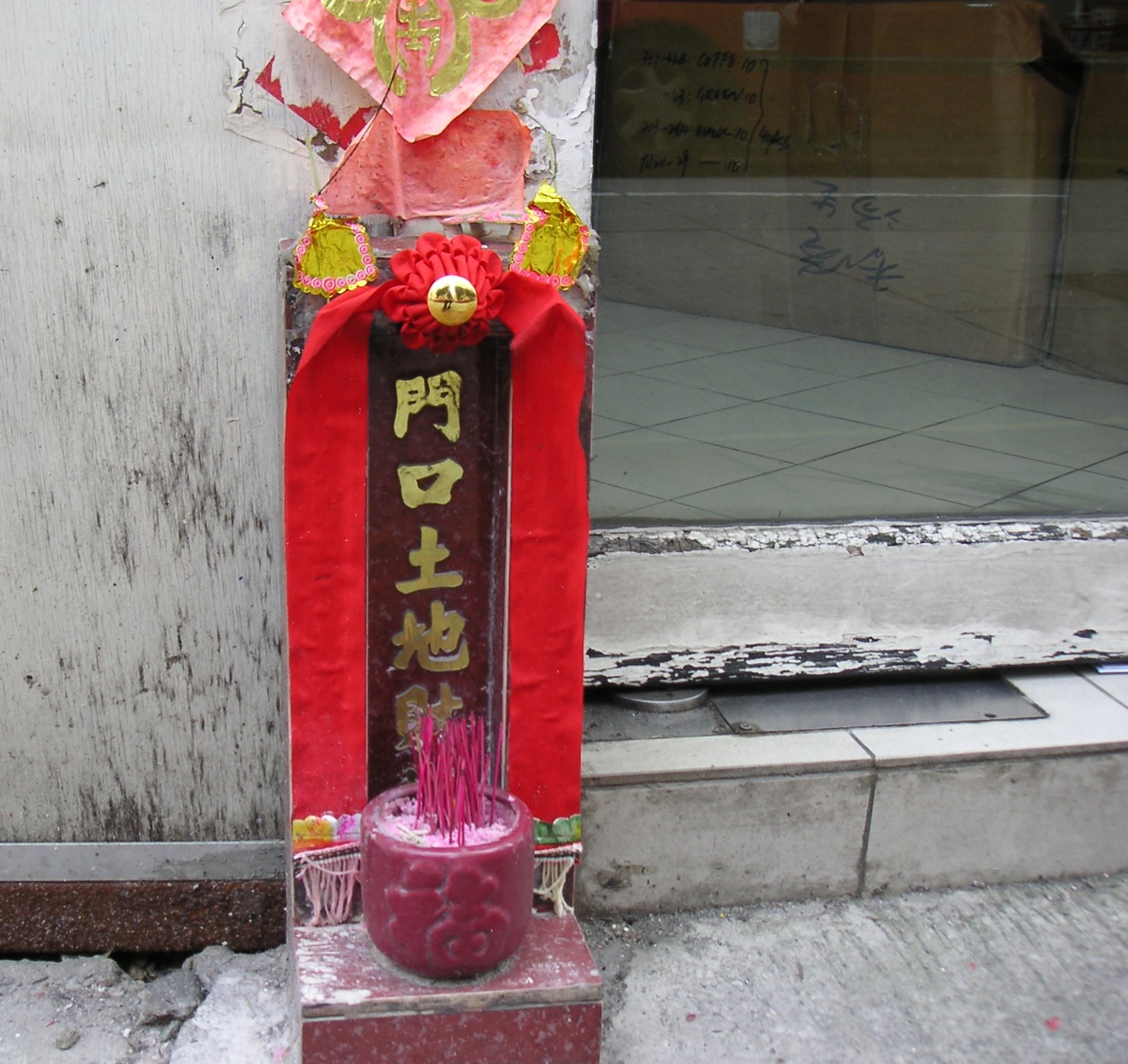
A Spirit tablet or Spirit seat in Hong KongHong Kong Street Shrine

Dizhu shen (Chinese: 地主神; pinyin: Dìzhǔ shén) are deities worshipped in Chinese folk beliefs who are analogous but not to be confused with Tudigong. In China, Dizhu shen (地主神) are considered deities below Sheshen and City Gods.

The tablet for the Landlord God is typically inscribed with two rows:

On the left: (in Singapore and Malaysia) "The Landlord Wealth God of the Overseas Tang People" (唐番地主財神) or (in Hong Kong and Chinese diaspora elsewhere) "The Landlord Wealth God from Front to Back" (前後地主財神)

On the right: The Dragon God of the Five Directions and Five Lands (五方五土龍神; fengshui).

The names are accompanied by a side couplet of various wordings that praise the virtues of the Landlord God. It is believed that the Landlord God has powers to help gather wealth, and the position of the tablet must be placed properly according to the laws of fengshui.

In Chinese, spirit houses are called 土地神屋 or Tudigong House, representing a link between the concept and the concept of an Earth Temple dedicated to a landlord deity or a Tudigong.

== See also ==
- City God (China)
- Sheshen
