= Tudigong =

Guardian or patron deity of a locality in Chinese folk religion

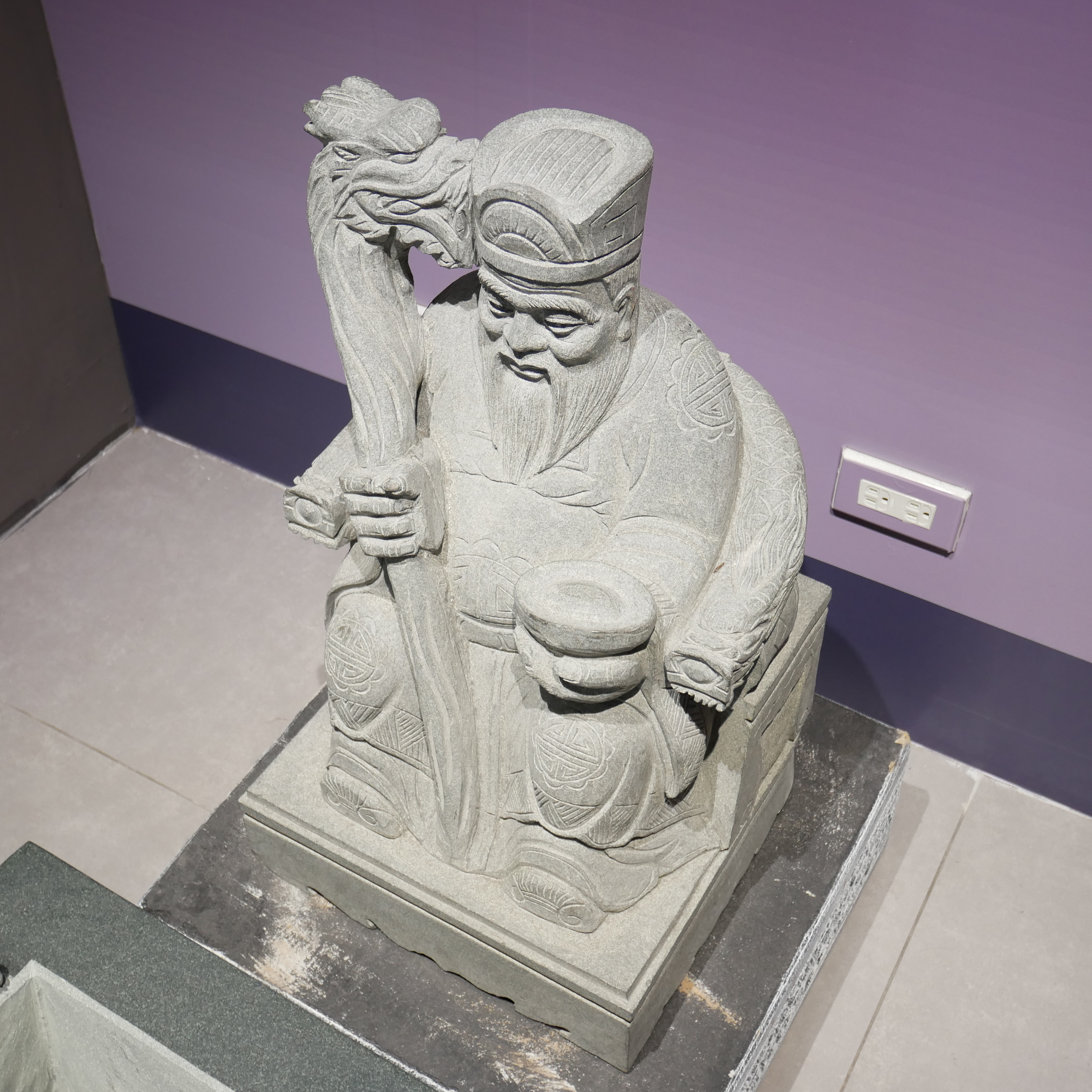
- Chinese: 土地公
- Literal meaning: Lord of the Land
Transcriptions
Standard Mandarin
- Hanyu Pinyin: Tǔ dì gōng
- Wade–Giles: Tu³-ti⁴-kung¹
- IPA: [tʰù.tî.kʊ́ŋ]
Yue: Cantonese
- Yale Romanization: tóu deih gūng
- Jyutping: tou2 dei6 gung1
- IPA: [tʰɔw˧˥.tej˨.kʊŋ˥]
Southern Min
- Hokkien POJ: Thó-tī-kong / Thó͘-tī-kong
Eastern Min
- Fuzhou BUC: Tū-dê-gŭng

Alternative Chinese name
- Chinese: 土地
Transcriptions
Standard Mandarin
- Hanyu Pinyin: Tǔ dì
- Wade–Giles: Tu³-ti⁴
Yue: Cantonese
- Yale Romanization: tóu deih
- Jyutping: tou2 dei6

Second alternative Chinese name
- Chinese: 土公
Transcriptions
Standard Mandarin
- Hanyu Pinyin: Tǔ gōng
- Wade–Giles: Tu³-kung¹
Yue: Cantonese
- Yale Romanization: tóu gūng
- Jyutping: tou2 gung1
Southern Min
- Hokkien POJ: Thó͘-kong

A Tudigong (Chinese: 土地公; lit. 'Lord of the Land') is a kind of Chinese tutelary deity of a specific location. There are several Tudigongs corresponding to different geographical locations and sometimes multiple ones will be venerated together in certain regions.

They are tutelary (i.e. guardian or patron) deities of locations and the human communities who inhabit it in Chinese folk religion, Buddhism, Confucianism, and Taoism. They are portrayed as old men with long beards.

The definitive characteristic of Tudigongs is that they are limited to their specific geographical locations. The Tudigong of one location is not the Tudigong of another location.

They are considered to be among the lowest ranked divinities, just below City Gods and above dizhu shen.

Often, a specific person who did a great service to their local community will be seen as becoming a Tudigong after their death.

When people move from one location to another, they will say goodbye to their local Tudigong and worship that of the new location.

The deities are considered to have a kind of appointed position like an alderman, with different deities being appointed to different areas.

Houtu is the overlord of all the Tudigongs ("Lord of Local Land"), Sheji ("the State"), Shan Shen ("God of Mountains"), City Gods ("God of Local City"), and dizhu shen.

== Names ==
Tudigongs go by a variety of names, including Tudigong (Chinese: 土地公; lit. 'Lord of the Land') or Tudishen (土地神; 'God of the Land'), also known simply as Tudi (土地; 'land', 'soil') and translated as Lord of the Earth,

Other names of the god include:

- Tugong (土公 "Lord of the Soil");
- Tudiye (土地爺 "Soil-Ground Father");
- Dabogong (大伯公 "Great Elder Lord") or Bogong (伯公 "Elder Lord");
  - Tua Pek Kong (Tâi-lô: Tuā-peh-kong) is used extensively as a replacement of Tudigong by the Chinese population across South East Asia, although they refer to the same deity.
- Sheshen (社神 "God of the Soil") or Shegong (社公 "Lord of the Soil");
  - This word may be confusing as 社 is often used to refer to society or shrines, but the original etymology was linked to soil.
- Tudijun (土帝君 "Ruler God of the Soil").

Extended titles of the god include:

- Tudihuofushen (土地或福神 "God who May Bless the Soil");
- Fudezhengshen (福德正神 "Right God of Blessing and Virtue") or Fudegong (福德公 "Lord of Blessing and Virtue").

Commoners often call their local Tudigong "grandfather" (yeye), which reflects the close relationship with the common people.

== Etymology ==
Etymology of Sheshen. Both characters are religious in nature

Tudigongs are believed to have originally developed out of the Sheshen belief system.

Shèshén (社神), also known as Tudigongs, are Chinese deities associated with the soil.

The character 社 is now primarily associated with Society, being present in such compounds as socialism (社會主義; Shèhuì zhǔyì) and sociology (社會學 Shèhuì xué) and social media (社群媒體, Shèqún méitǐ).

However, originally the character 社 meant soil, and had a connotation of divinity; see the diagram on the right for more info on its relationship with the Oracle bone script

The character 社 alone historically referred to such deities. It is a combination of deity (示) and soil (土), meaning "god of the land".

Sheshen are associated with soil and grain (shèjì, 社稷), with both sometimes being personified as husband and wife.

Tudigong means Tu (earth), Di, Gong (grandfather/duke).

Sacrifices to Sheshen transitioned to sacrifices to Tudigong.

== History ==
The earliest known sheshen was Gou Long, a son of Gonggong who was appointed as a god of the soil by Zhuanxu.

Tudigongs developed from land worship. Before City Gods became prominent in China, land worship had a hierarchy of deities conforming strictly to social structure, in which the emperor, kings, dukes, officials, and common people were allowed to worship only the land gods within their command; the highest land deity was the Houtu ("Queen of the Earth").

Ranked beneath City Gods, the Tudigongs have been very popular among villagers as the grassroot deities since the 14th century during the Ming dynasty. Some scholars speculate that this change came because of an imperial edict, because it is reported that the Hongwu Emperor of the Ming dynasty was born in a Tudigong shrine. The image of a Tudigong is that of a simply clothed, smiling, white-bearded man. His wife, the Grandmother of the Village, Tǔdìpó, looks like a normal old lady.

In later generations, they became associated with Wish trees.

== Variants ==
=== Tudipo ===
In the countryside, they are sometimes given wives, Tǔdìpó (土地婆 "Grandmother of the Soil and the Ground"), placed next to them on the altar. They may be seen as just and benevolent deities on the same rank as their husbands, or as grudging old women holding back their husband's benedictions, which explains why one does not always receive fair retribution for good behavior.

Another story says that Tudipo is supposed to be a young lady. After Tudigong received a heavenly rank, he gave everything that the people asked for. When one of the Deities went down to Earth to do inspections, he saw that Tudigong was distributing blessings unnecessarily. Soon after that, the Deity went to the Celestial Palace and reported to the Jade Emperor.

After the Jade Emperor knew this, he found out that there was a lady that was going to be killed, but she was not guilty. Thus, the Jade Emperor told a Deity to go down to Earth and bring the lady to heaven. When the lady was brought to the Celestial Palace, the Jade Emperor bestowed her to Tudigong as his wife. She was ordered to look after how many blessings Tudigong distributes and that they not be unnecessarily distributed. This is why many people do not want to pay respect to Tudipo, because they are afraid that she will not let Tudigong give much wealth to them.

== Festivals ==
In Taiwan, festivals dedicated to Tudigong typically take place on the second day of the second month and the 15th day of the eighth month on the Chinese lunar calendar. The second day of the second month is said to be Tudigong's birthday. Today these deities are associated with Ritual opera.

== Temples ==
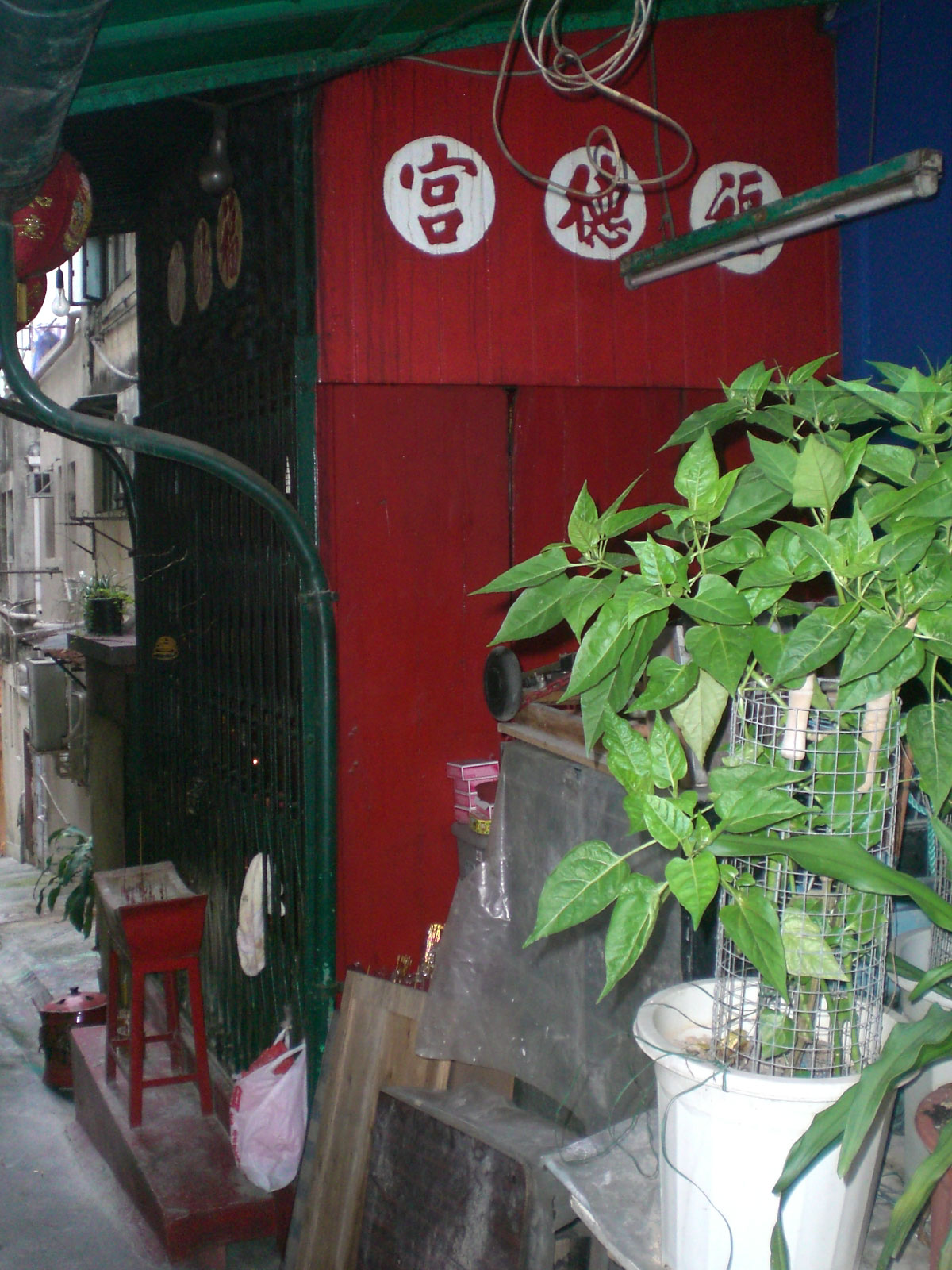
A Tudigong Temple in Sheung Wan, Hong Kong.

Tudigong temples are common across China, Tibet, Taiwan, Macau and Hong Kong.

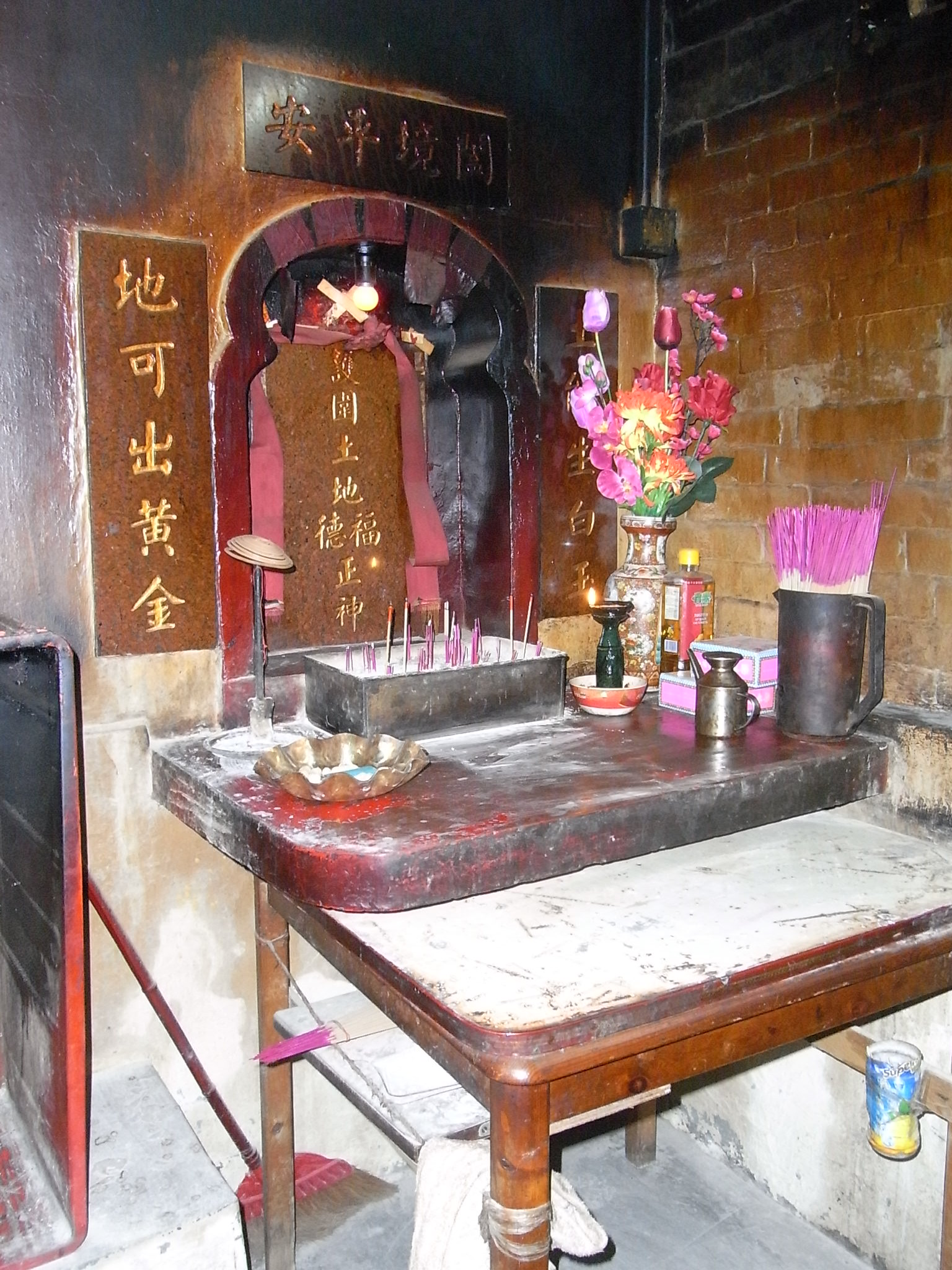
A shrine to a Tudigong within the entrance gate of Tai Wai Village, a walled village of Hong Kong.

In Chinese, Spirit houses are called 土地神屋 or Tudigong House, representing a link between the concept and the concept of a Tudigong temple dedicated to a dizhu shen or a Tudigong.

A notable example in Nuannuan District has two Tudigong temples next to each other for different Tudigongs.

Many temples house small shrines featuring the image of Tudigong, which are commonly located beneath the main altar or below the house door. Many devotees offer prayers for good health and wealth. Tudigong is also traditionally venerated before the burials to express gratitude for using his land to return their bodies to the earth.

It is reported that the Hongwu Emperor of the Ming dynasty was born in a Tudigong shrine.

During the cultural revolution, many Tudigong shrines were destroyed. However, many were recently rebuilt.

=== Existing Temples ===
- Checheng Fu'an Temple
- Zhushan Zinan Temple
- Mun San Fook Tuck Chee temple

== Gallery ==
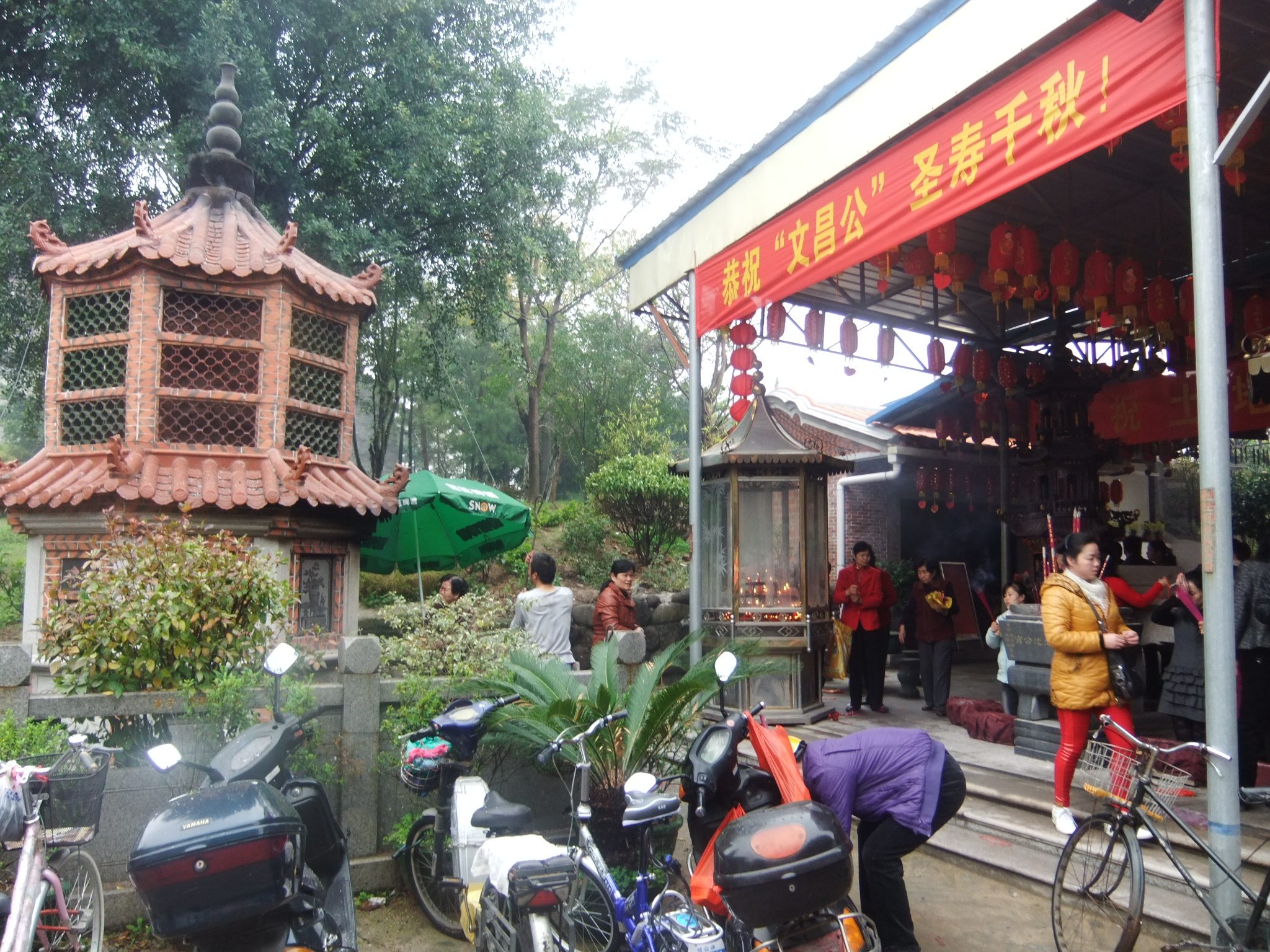
A Tudigong temple in Quanzhou, Fujian.

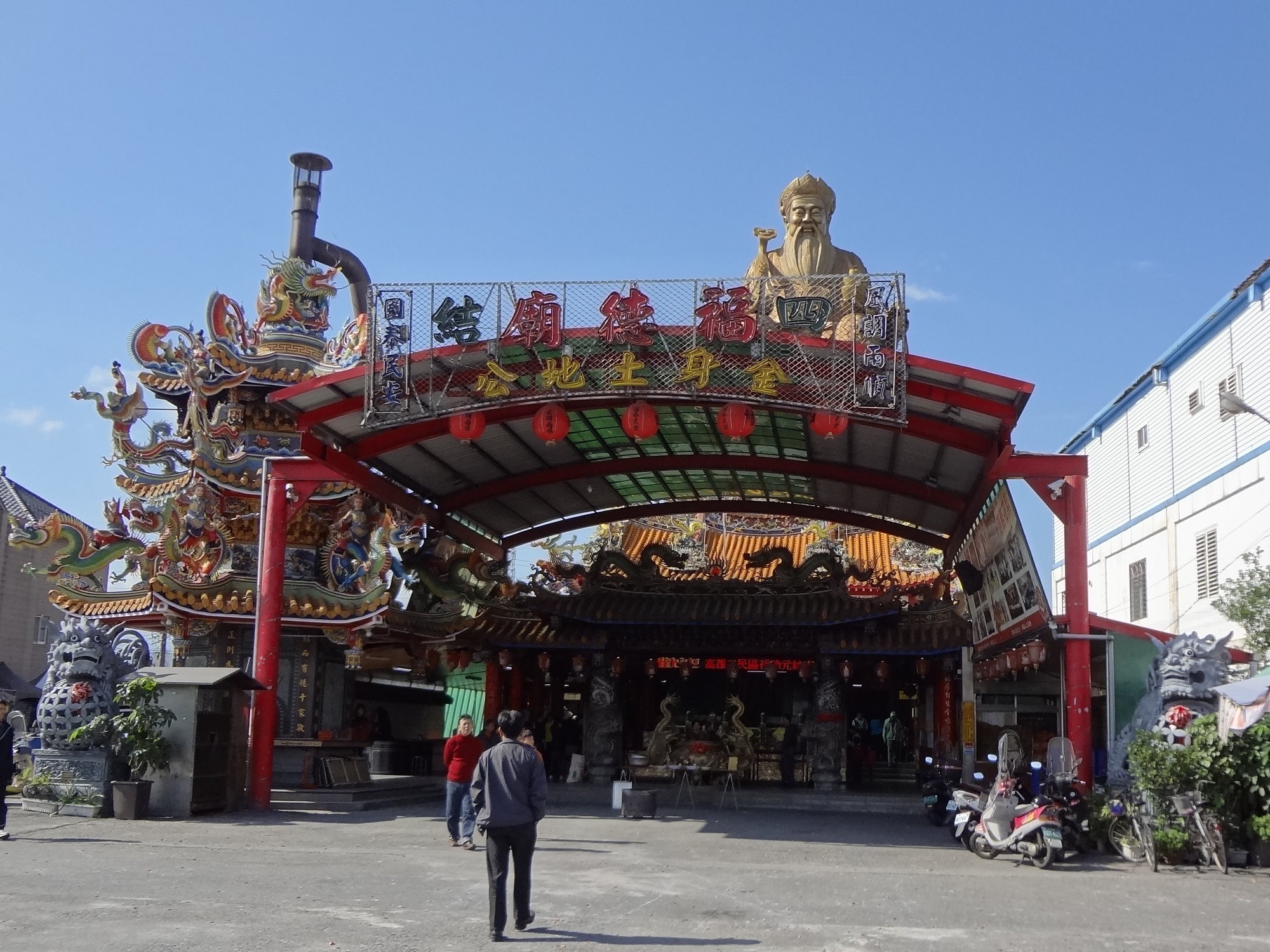
A temple dedicated to Fude in Wujie, Yilan, Taiwan.

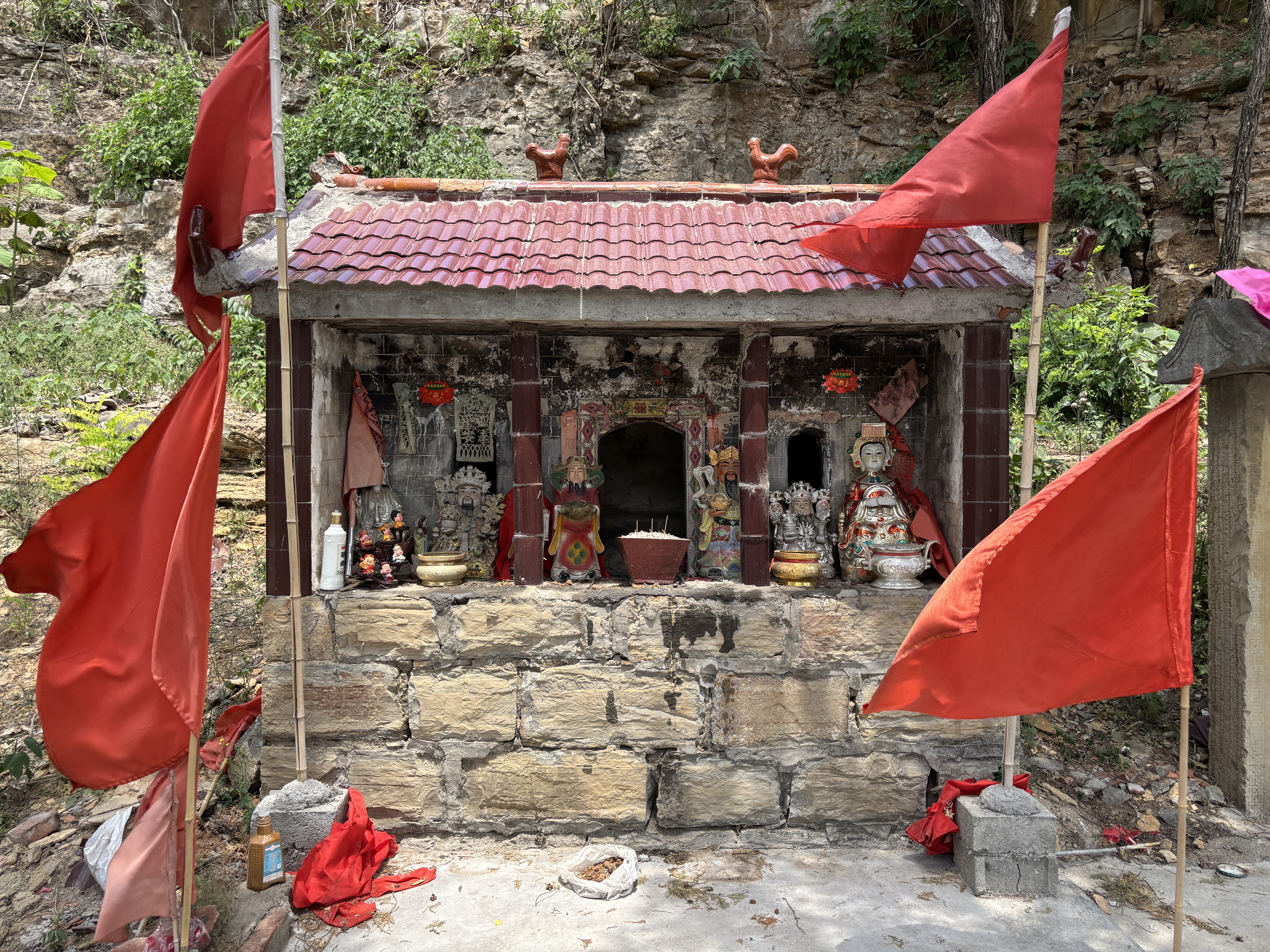
A Tudimiao in Guo Village, Yishui, Shandong

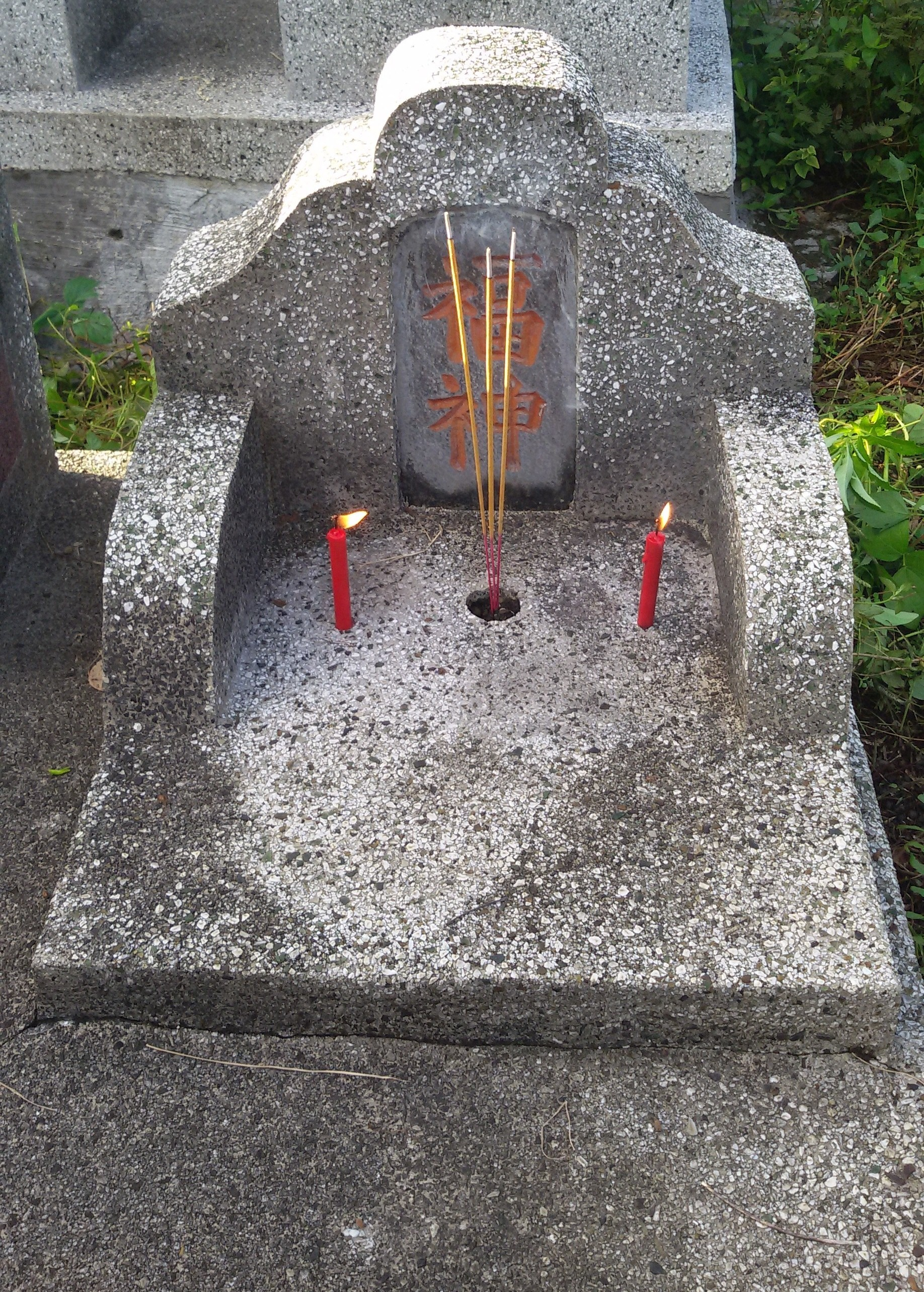
A small altar for Tudi, part of a Chinese tomb, Indonesia.

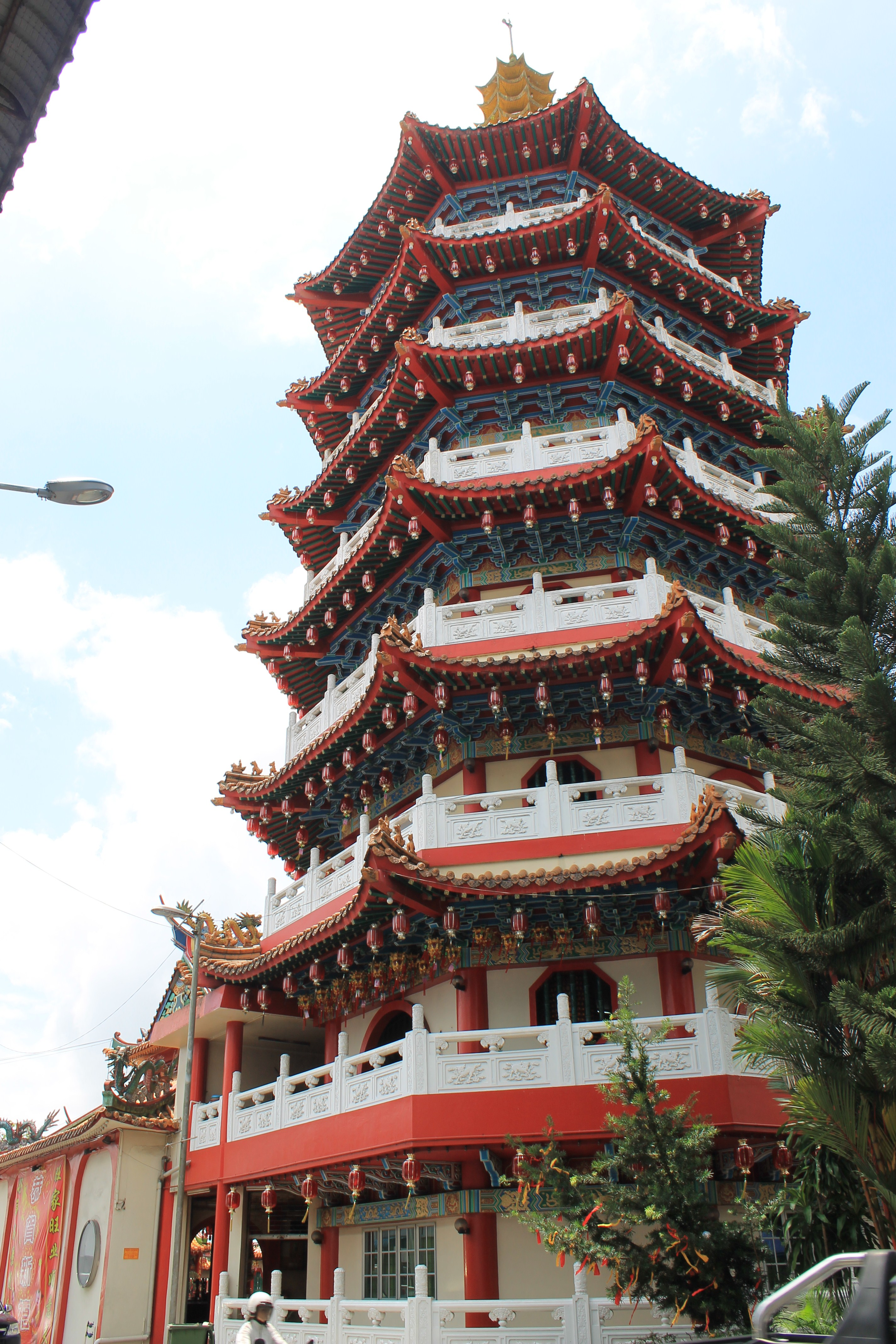
Tower of the Temple of Dabogong (locally Tua Pek Kong) in Sibu, Sarawak, Malaysia.

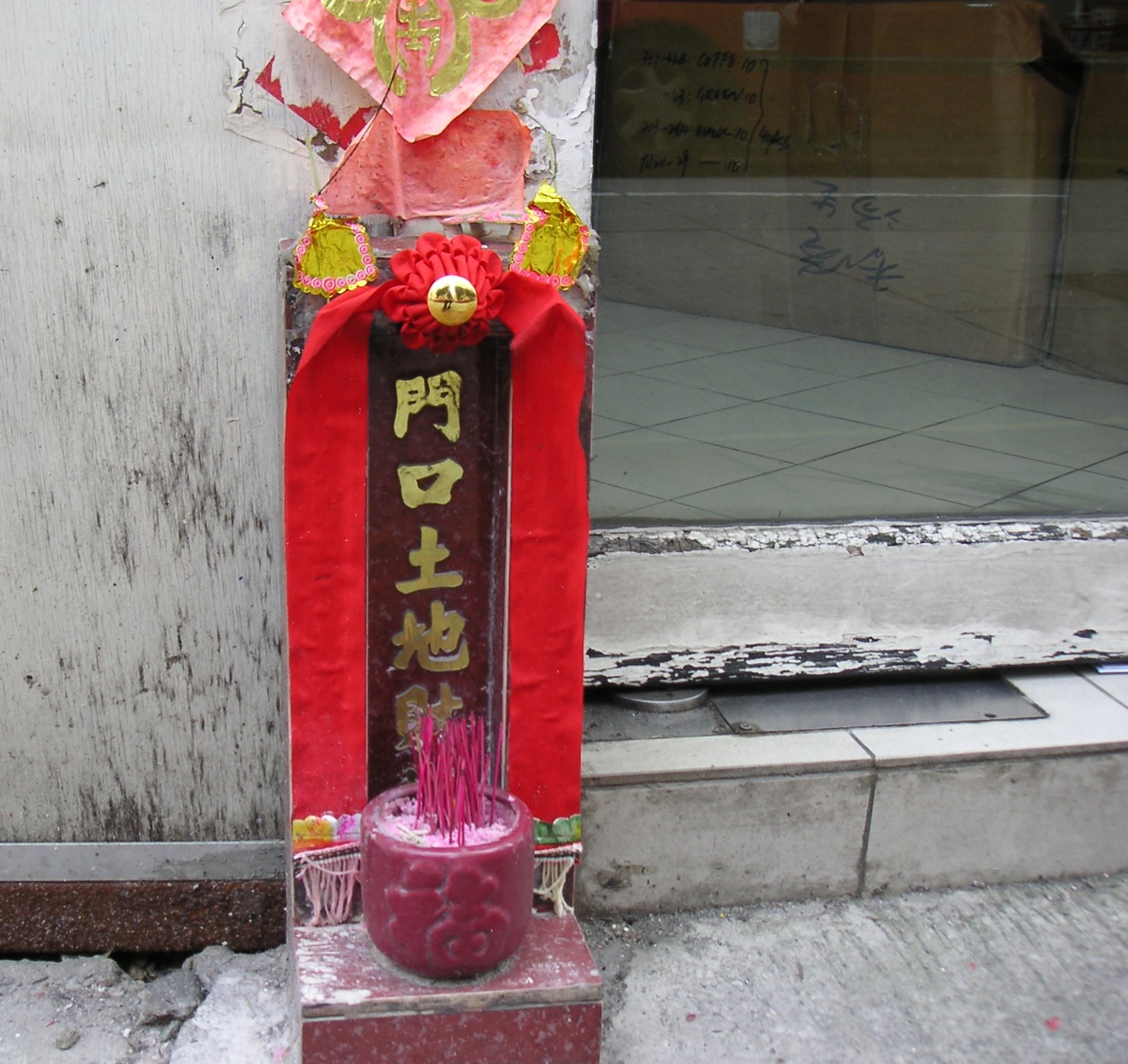
A doorway spirit tablet dedicated to Tudigong in Hong Kong. It invokes Tudigong to bring blessings.

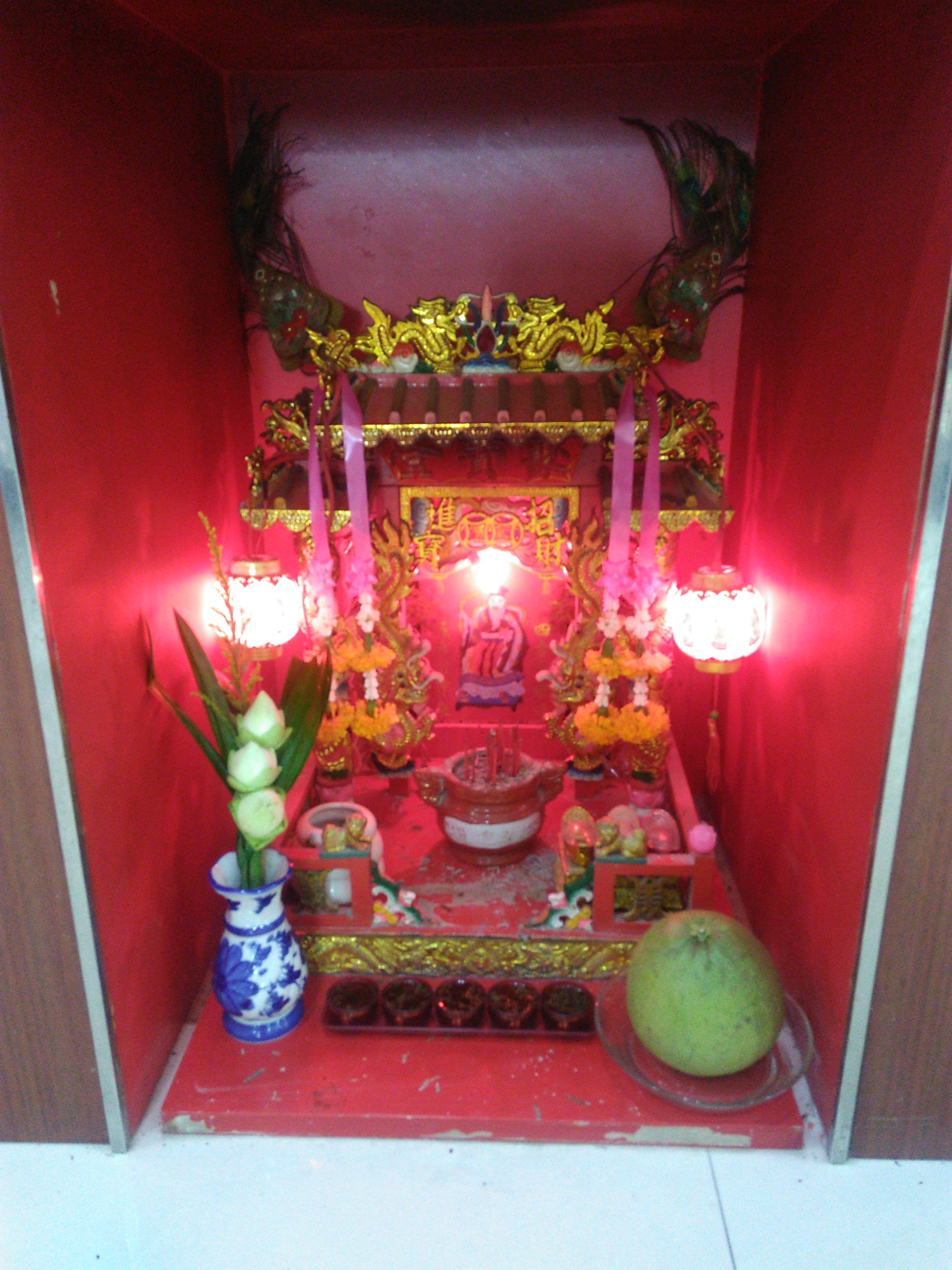
A small altar in a private house, Pattaya, Thailand.

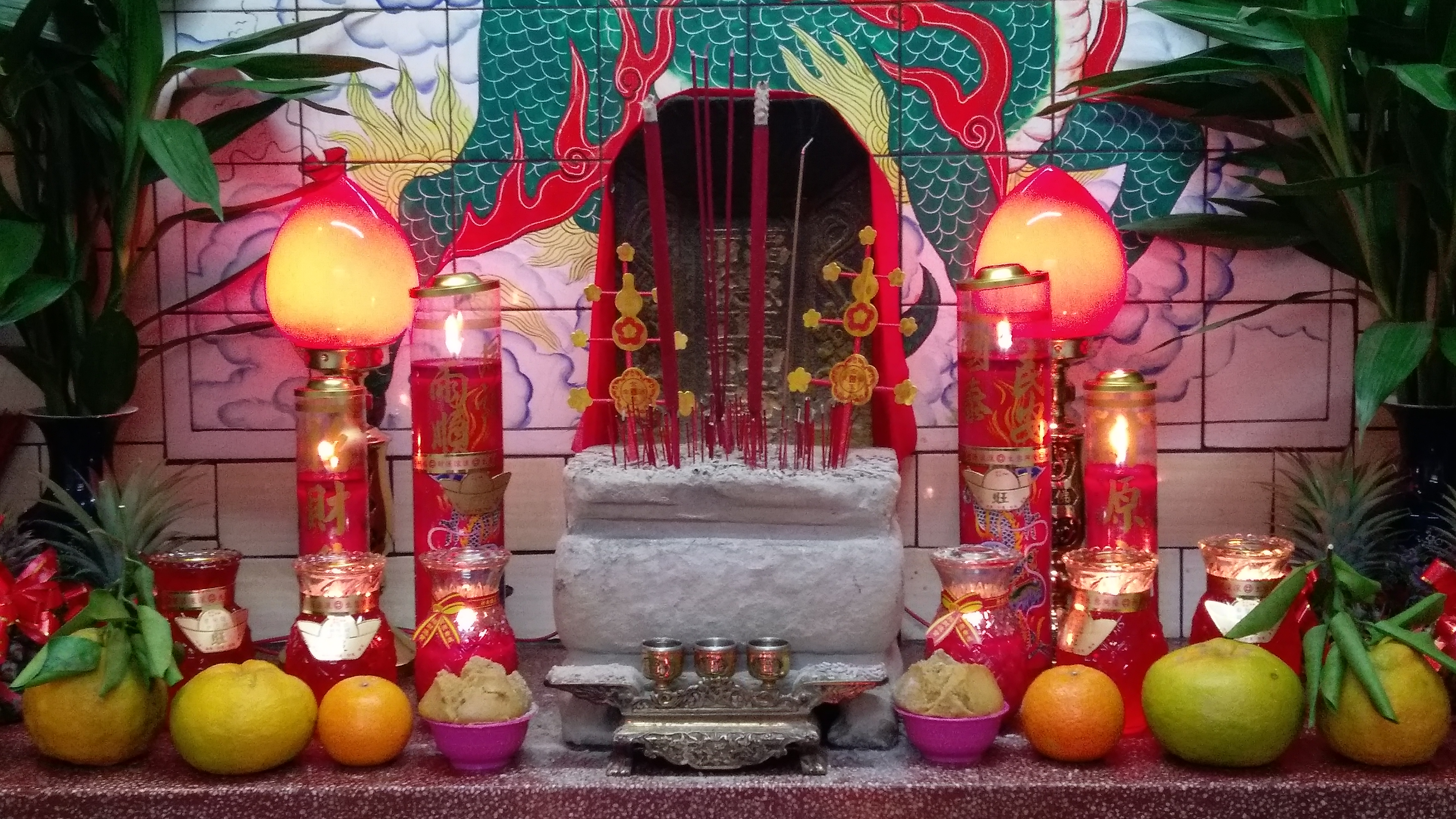
A roadside shrine to Tudigong in Miaoli, Taiwan

== See also ==
- Agriculture in Chinese mythology
- Cai Shen (財神)
- Chinese folk religion
- Chinese mythology
- Fengshui
- Hou Tu (後土)
- Men Shen (門神)
- Nisse (folklore)
- Okuninushi
- Ông Địa (翁地)
- Religion in China
- She Ji (社稷)
- Spirit tablet
- Tian Di (天地)
- Tua Pek Kong (大伯公)
- Zao Jun (灶君)
- Ourea – Greek mountain deities
