= List of City God Temples in China =

This is a list of City God Temples in China.

Temple	Location	Level	Main gods	Secondary gods	Notes	References
City God Temple of Beijing	Beijing	Capital	Wen Tianxiang, Yang Jiaoshan		Rear court room remained	
City God Temple of Guangzhou	Guangzhou, Guangdong	Capital	Liu Yan	Hai Rui, Yang Jiaoshan		
City God Temple of Hangzhou	Hangzhou, Zhejiang	Provincial	Zhou Xin			
City God Temple of Hefei	Hefei, Anhui	Prefectural	Sun Jue			
City God Temple of Jinan	Jinan, Shandong	Prefectural	Chen Kuan			
City God Temple of Jinan	Jinan, Shandong	Provincial	Yang Xuewen, Zhao Jingwen			
City God Temple of Juyong Pass	Beijing	Capital	Xu Da			
City God Temple of Nanjing	Nanjing, Jiangsu	Capital	Jiang Ziwen		Destroyed in the Taiping Rebellion	
City God Temple of Nanchang	Nanchang, Jiangxi	Prefectural	Guan Ying, Huang Gongqing		Dismantled in 1958	
City God Temple of Ningbo	Ningbo, Zhejiang	Prefectural	Ji Xin			
City God Temple of Pingyao	Pingyao County, Shanxi	County				
City God Temple of Shanghai	Shanghai	County	Qin Yubo	Huo Guang, Chen Huacheng		
City God Temple of Suzhou	Suzhou, Jiangsu	Prefectural	Lord Chunshen			
City God Temple of Xi'an	Xi'an, Shaanxi	Capital	Ji Xin			

== Hong Kong ==
Shing Wong Temples (Chinese: 城隍廟) in Hong Kong are dedicated to Shing Wong, a god who protects a city. They include:

Location	Notes	Status	References	Photographs
Kam Wa Street, Shau Kei Wan, Eastern District 22.277869°N 114.230627°E	Shing Wong Temple, Shau Kei Wan (筲箕灣城隍廟) Built in 1877. Formerly named Fook Tak Tsz (福德祠), it was renamed "Shing Wong Temple" after an expansion project in 1974. Managed by the Chinese Temples Committee. The interior of the temple can be explored with Google Street View.	Grade III		
Temple Street, Yau Ma Tei 22.309954°N 114.170686°E	Shing Wong Temple (城隍廟) Within the Tin Hau Temple Complex. Built in 1878, it is the second largest of the five buildings of the complex, after the Tin Hau Temple.	Declared (complex)		
Po Lam Road, near the junction with Sau Mau Ping Road, Sau Mau Ping. Near Po Tat Estate, Kwun Tong District 22.318572°N 114.235771°E	Shing Wong Temple (城隍廟) Part of the Sau Mau Ping Temple Complex.	Not listed		
Sau Mau Ping Road, Sau Mau Ping. 22.321582°N 114.232213°E	Part of a temple complex built in 1964 without government approval. Demolished in 2008 to make way for the new On Tat Estate.	Not listed	picture picture	
Fu Tei Ha Tsuen (虎地下村), Fu Tei, Tuen Mun District 22.413411°N 113.988348°E	Shing Wong Temple (城隍廟) Within the Nam On Buddhist Monastery (南安佛堂). The Shing Wong Temple was built in 1964.	Nil grade		
