= City God (China) =

Chinese tutelary deities of cities, towns, and villages

- Statue of the City God in the Wen'ao Chenghuang Temple in Magong, Taiwan
- Chinese: 城隍神
Transcriptions
Standard Mandarin
- Hanyu Pinyin: Chénghuángshén
Yue: Cantonese
- Yale Romanization: Sìhng wòhng sàhn
Southern Min
- Hokkien POJ: Sîng-hông-sîn

A City God (Chinese: 城隍神; pinyin: Chénghuángshén; lit. 'god of the boundary') is a tutelary deity in Chinese folk religion who is believed to protect the people and the affairs of the particular village, town or city of great dimension, and the corresponding location in the afterlife. City God cults appeared over two millennia ago, and originally involved worship of a protective deity of a town's walls and moats. Later, the term came to be applied to deified leaders from the town, who serve in authority over the souls of the deceased from that town, and intervene in the affairs of the living, in conjunction with other officials of the hierarchy of divine beings. City Gods are considered above tǔdìgōng ('lords of local land'), which themselves are above landlord deities.

== Etymology ==
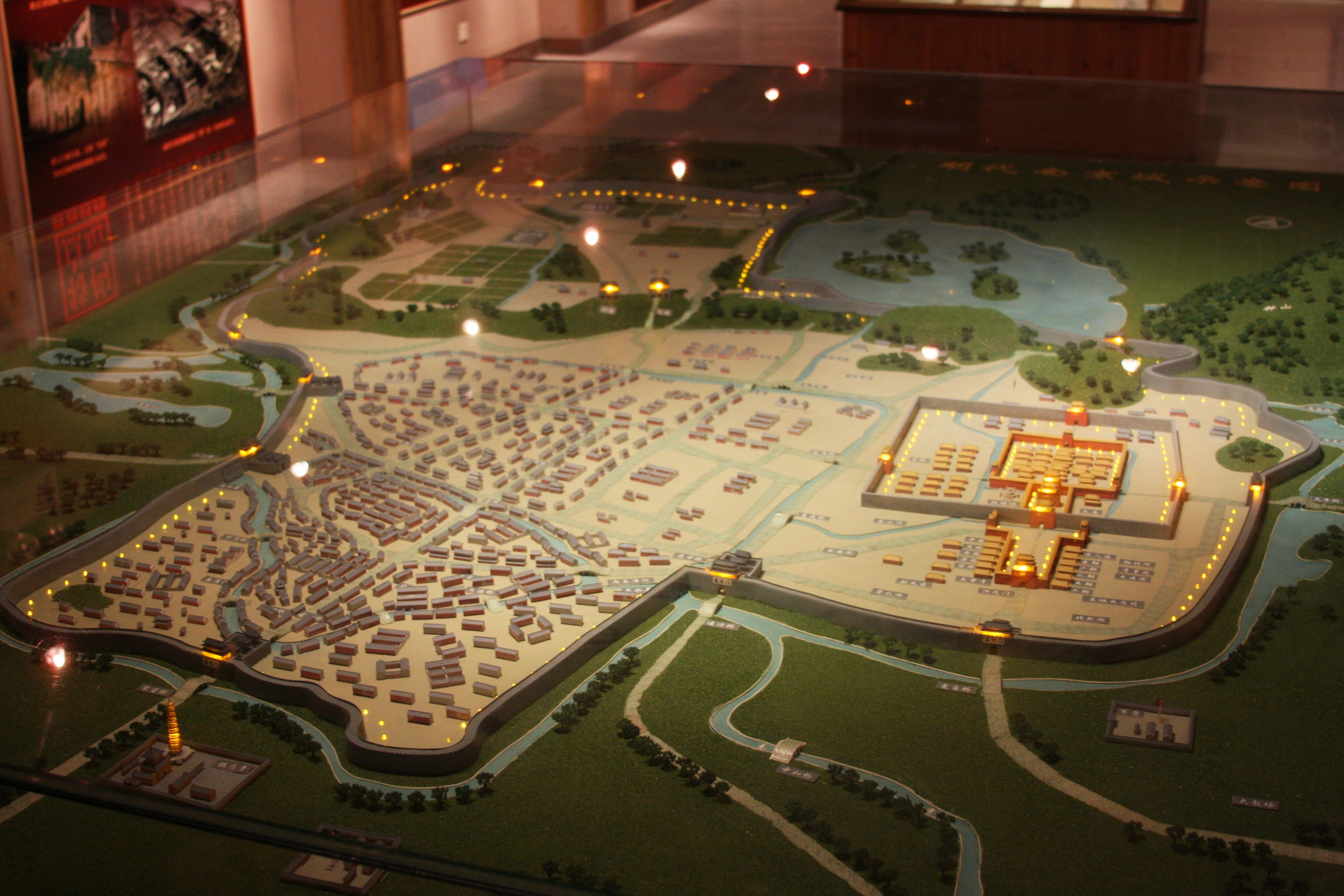
Model reproducing a view of Nanjing in the Ming dynasty (1368–1644), showing a city wall and moat combination, a model of city defense which had at this point evolved over many centuries, together with the worship of the City God.

In the name Chenghuangshen (城隍神), the first character cheng (城) means 'city wall' (a 'defensive rampart'; or, by extension, 'walled city') and the second character, huang (隍), literally means 'moat'. Shen (神) means 'a god'. Put together, Chenghuangshen was originally the name of a deity or type of deity believed to be able to provide divine protection to a city's physical defenses, particularly its surrounding wall and moat. Later the concept became more generalized, and the meaning extended to the office itself of such a deity, rather than the presumed office-holder (in later times, it was standard to officially appoint the spirit of the government official in charge of the city to a three-year term as City God, upon his decease).

== History ==
There are temples dedicated to the local City God in many cities of China. Much as the ancient Indians, the ancient Sumerians, and the ancient Greeks did, the Chinese traditionally believed that guardian gods watched over cities. Chenghuangshen are believed to be involved in communal concerns such as the need for rain, and may be involved in personal requests such as recovery from illness. Town residents may appeal to the City God for help in a natural disaster or other crisis. The City God may also be called upon to help those who are accused of crimes. The accused appear before the god and ask for a sign to help prove their innocence.

Usually, these patron gods are deified deceased officials. Chenghuangshen are believed to hold an important position in the imperial times it was often debated whether local gods such as the City God held more power than the local officials. There could also be a relation between the City God and the official. The official or magistrate would often turn to the Chenghuangshen for advice and help in governing the city.

Over time a large number of City God positions were created by official decrees, along with accompanying temples and images. Of these offices of City God, some might be a low ranking post in charge of a small village; others might be on the level of a whole province. In any case, by the nineteenth century the duties of the City God generally included accompanying three official processions per year and to perform certain administrative functions for the local spirits of the dead: on the 3rd day of the 3rd lunar month to let the ghost-spirits out of their winter quarters; on the 1st of the 7th month, to take census of the ghosts and ensure that they were fed; and on the biggest event of the three, the 1st of the 10th month, to gather together all the spirits, provide them all with winter clothing, and put them in their winter dwellings.

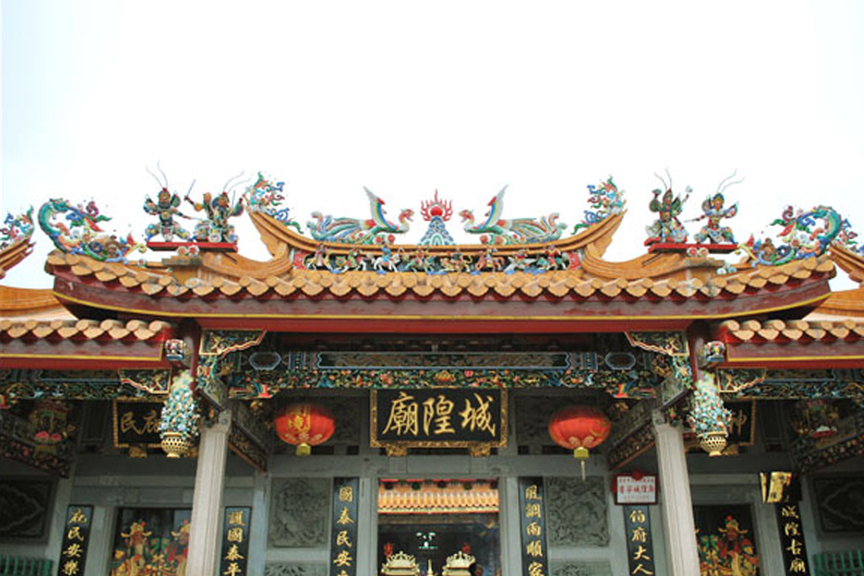
Detail of the Cheng Huang Temple of Puning.

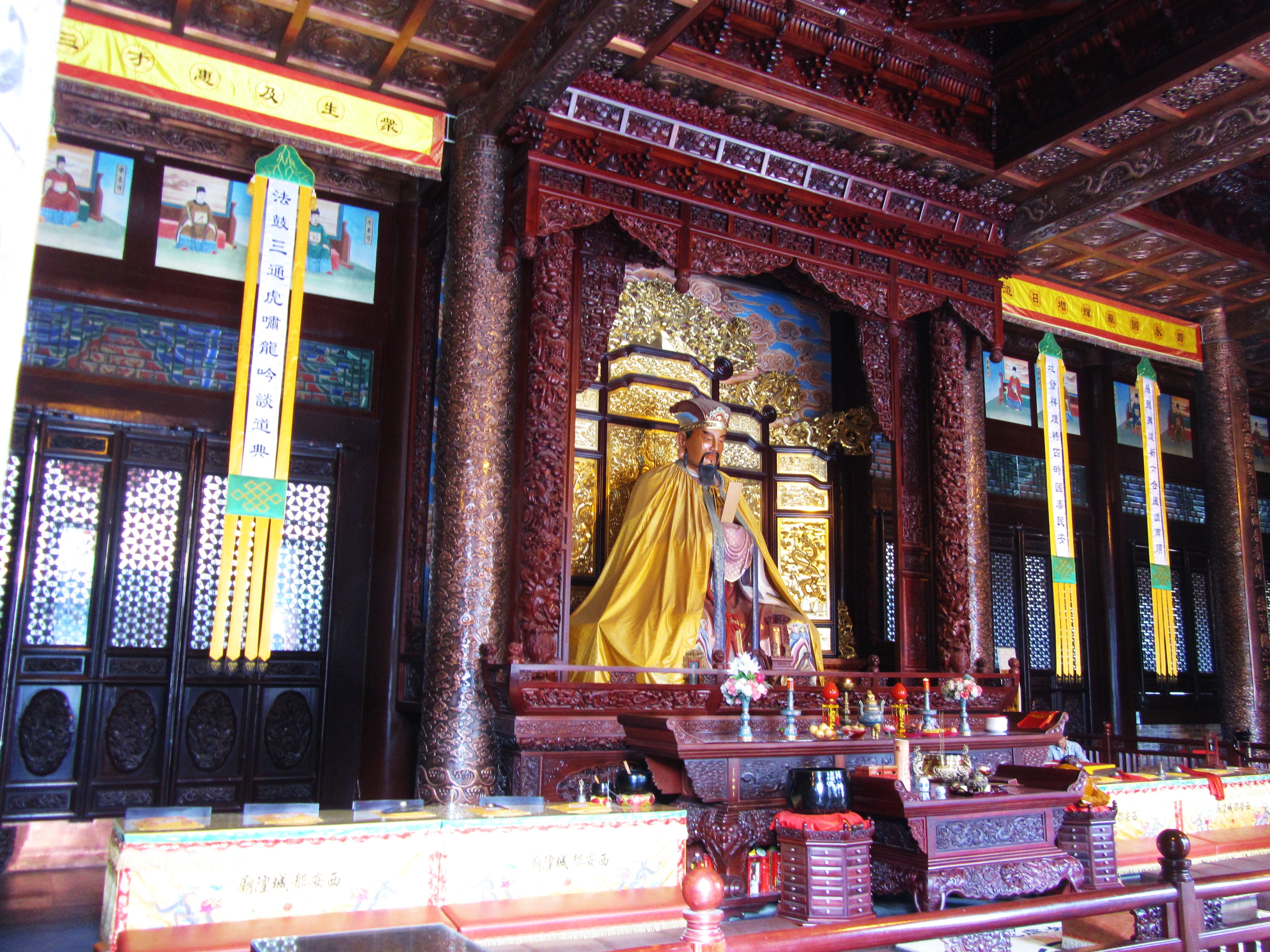
Statue of the Deity in the Cheng Huang Temple of Xi'an.

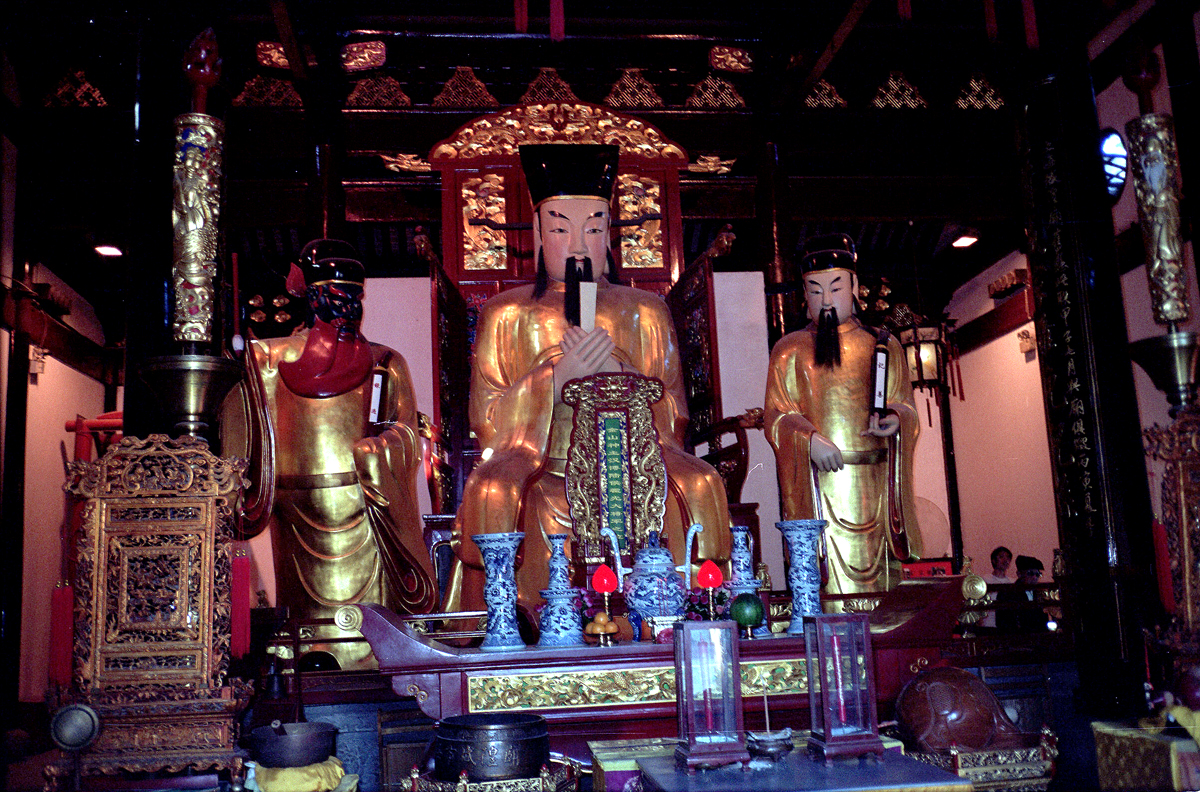
The Chenghuangshen of Shanghai.

== Worship ==
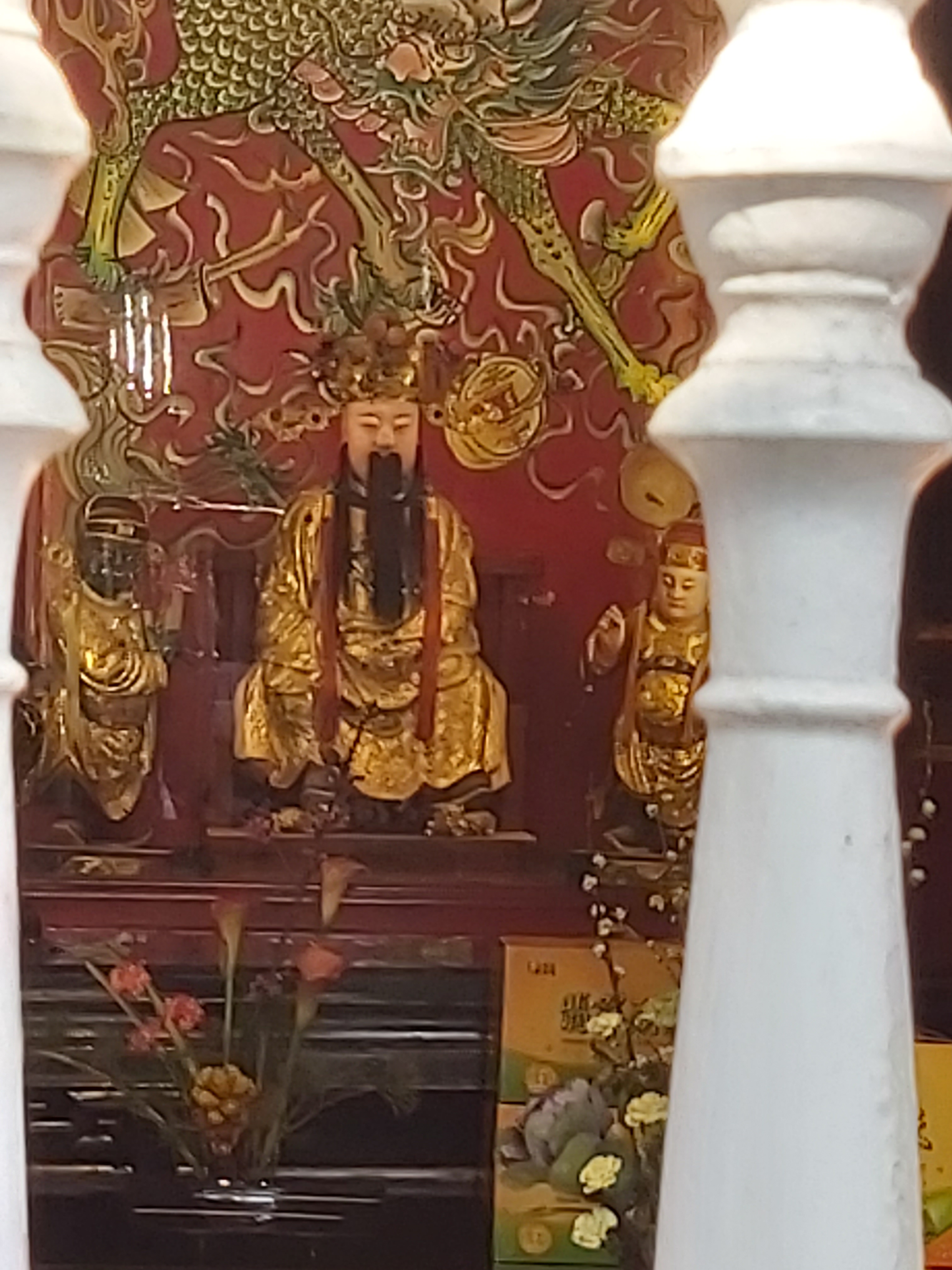
City God statue at Bangka Lungshan Temple in Taipei

Chinese culture traditionally maintained a distinction between official religion and popular religion. In official religion, worship of the City God was according to the dictates of written legislation and was to be performed by officials and degree holders. The associated activities were designed to help legitimize the state in the eyes of the common people and preserve local social status distinctions. The prescribed sacrifices for a Chenghuangshen are described in the "Auspicious Rites" section of the Da Qing Tongli, the Qing dynasty manual for rituals. The official worship of a City God was a solemn and dignified event, with various ceremonies held inside the temples. The animals and food that were sacrificed to the Chenghuangshen were carefully inspected by the religious officials to make sure that they were good enough for the City God.

On the other hand, the City God was liable for punishment if he failed to perform his duties as requested: for example failure on his part to bring rain when properly asked could result in his sacred image being exposed to the burning rays of the sun, or being bodily whipped by the governor or magistrate.

The popular worship of a Chenghuangshen is much more flexible. People from both rural and urban areas come to pray to him or her, asking for specific favors. The most common favor requested in these prayers is good health. On the City God's birthday the people of the town or city have a great celebration (miaohui) to honor the City God. These ceremonies often draw huge crowds of people and involve theatrical performances, sales of refreshments, fireworks, firecrackers, beating of gongs and drums, and incense burning.

== Hong Kong ==
During the Qing dynasty, the emperor appointed a City God (Shing Wong) for all major cities in mainland China to govern and look after their land. Hong Kong had no appointed magistrate and therefore no protection of a Shing Wong.

In 1877 Hong Kong built their first Shing Wong temple, which was originally named Fook Tak Tsz (福德祠). It remains there today, at the junction of Shau Kei Wan Main Street East and Kam Wa Street, in Shau Kei Wan. It has undergone many updates and name changes. A new outer wall was built in 1974, giving the feeling of a temple within a temple. The temple is now officially called the Shing Wong Temple. The deities Tudigong (土地), Shing Wong, and Ng Tung (五通神) are enshrined in the temple.

There is some evidence that, prior to the building of the Fook Tak Tsz in Shau Kei Wan, there was a Shing Wong temple built at the junction of Shing Wong Street and Hollywood Road, where Queen's College later stood. However, both buildings have been torn down. There are other temples located in Hong Kong that house the deity Shing Wong, such as the Man Mo Temple.

== People's Republic of China ==
Chinese government officials have sponsored seminars at Cheng Huang temples across Fujian in an attempt to promote Chinese unification.

== Thailand ==
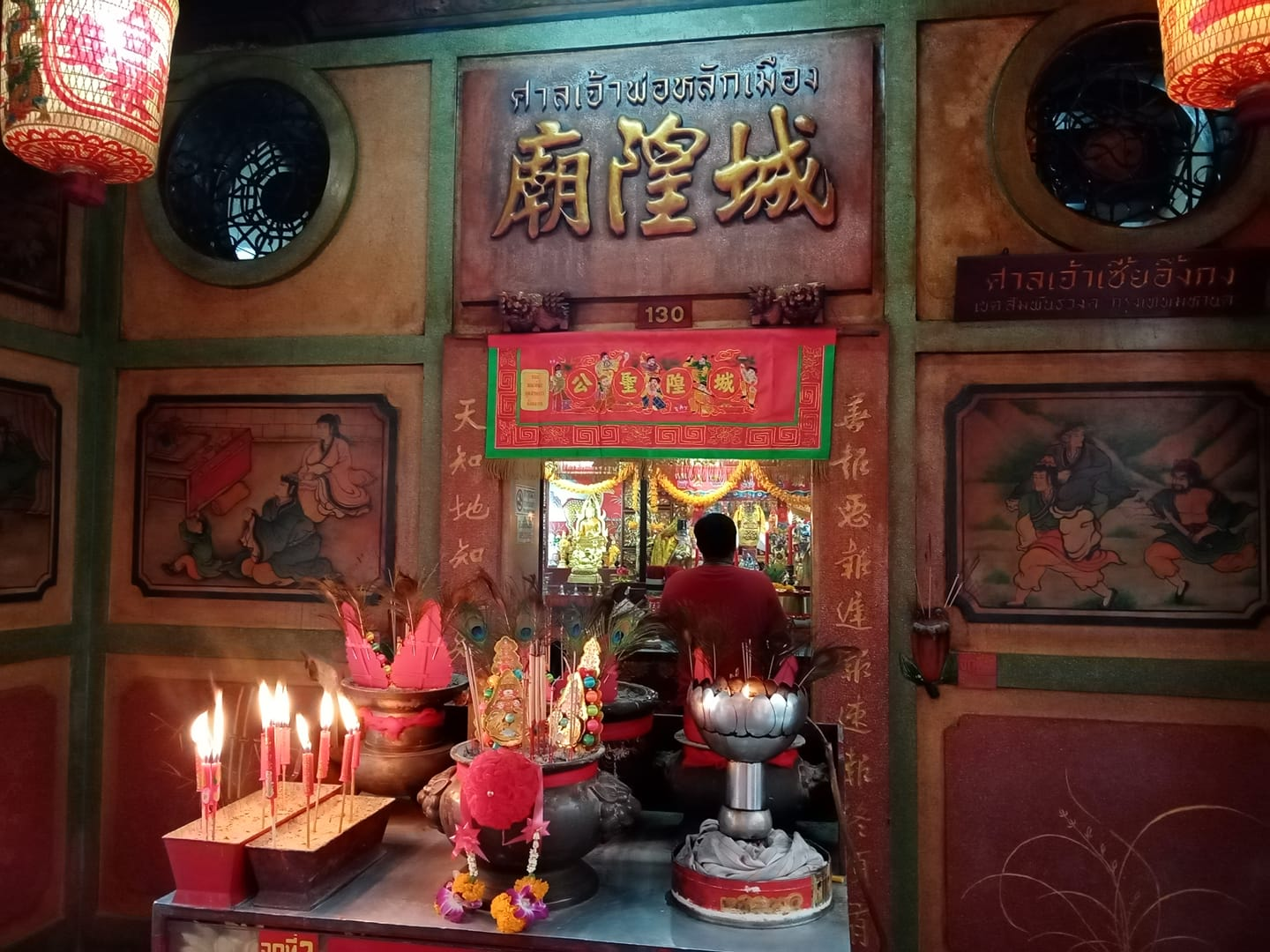
Sia Ung Gong Shrine, the temple of Chenghuangshen, Sampheng, Bangkok.

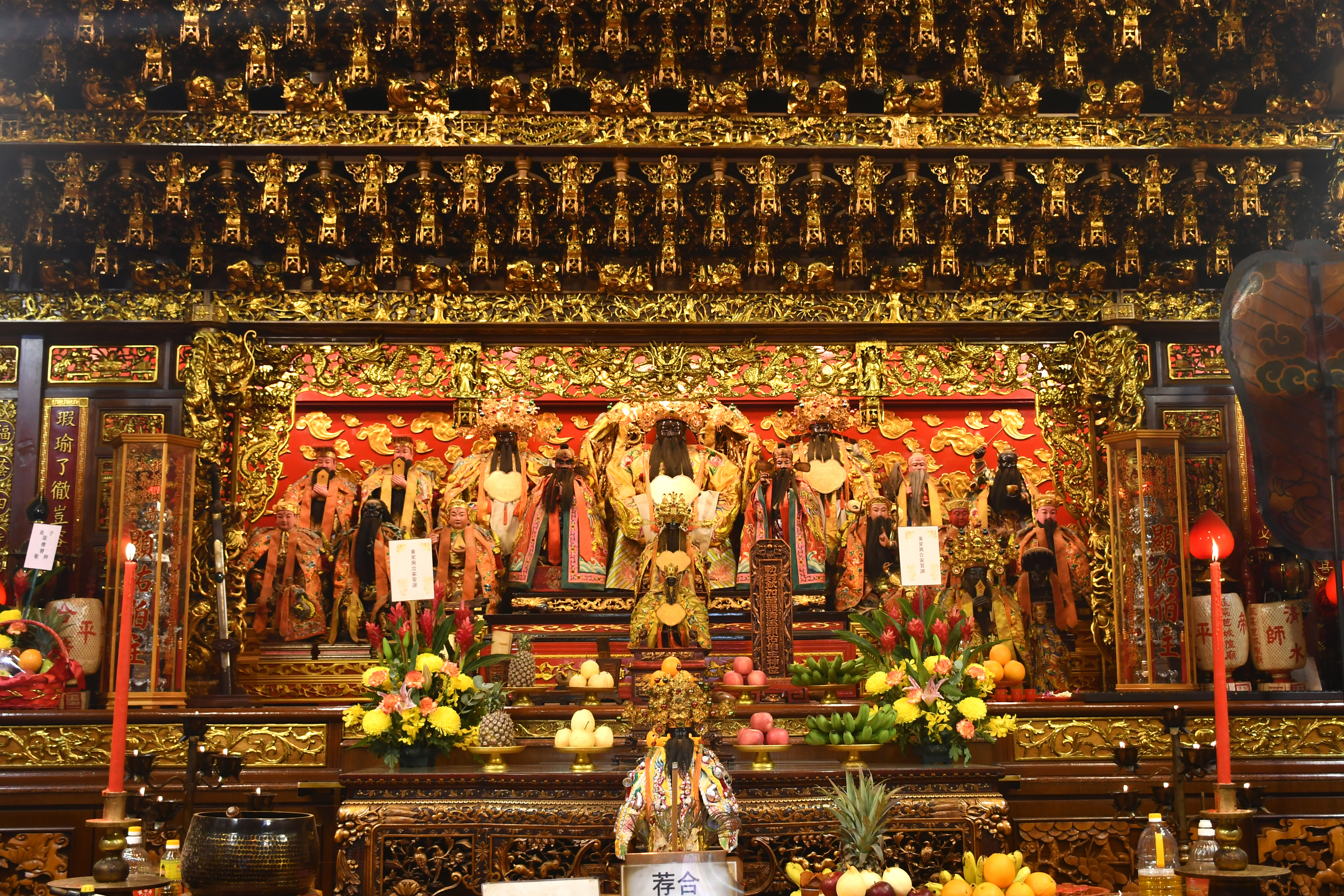
Altar to Chenghuangshen and other Taoism gods at Lorong Koo Chye Sheng Hong Temple, Singapore.

In Thailand, Chenghuangshen is comparable to the Lak Mueang (city pillar) of Thai beliefs. He is often less known or worshiped as other guardian gods, such as Tudigong, Pun Tao Kong. His temples are few, such as in a small alley in Sampheng, part of Chinatown. Often his images are worshiped and enshrined with other deities in shrines or temples in different cities, such as Four Heavenly Kings in Wat Mangkon Kamalawat, etc.

== Prominent temples ==
- Chenghuang Temple of Hsinchu
- Chiayi Cheng Huang Temple
- City God Temple of Shanghai
- City God Temple of Pingyao
- Magong City God Temple
- Taipei Xia-Hai City God Temple

== See also ==
- Dōsojin
- Hou Tu (后土)
- Heibai Wuchang (黑白無常)
- List of City God Temples in China
- Pun Tao Kong (本頭公)
- Seonangsin
- Thành hoàng
- Tu Di Gong (土地公)
- Lak Mueang, a similar belief in mainland Southeast Asia
