= Battle of Woosung =

First Opium War battle near Shanghai (1842)

Coordinates: 31°22′30″N 121°30′0″E

- Part of the First Opium War
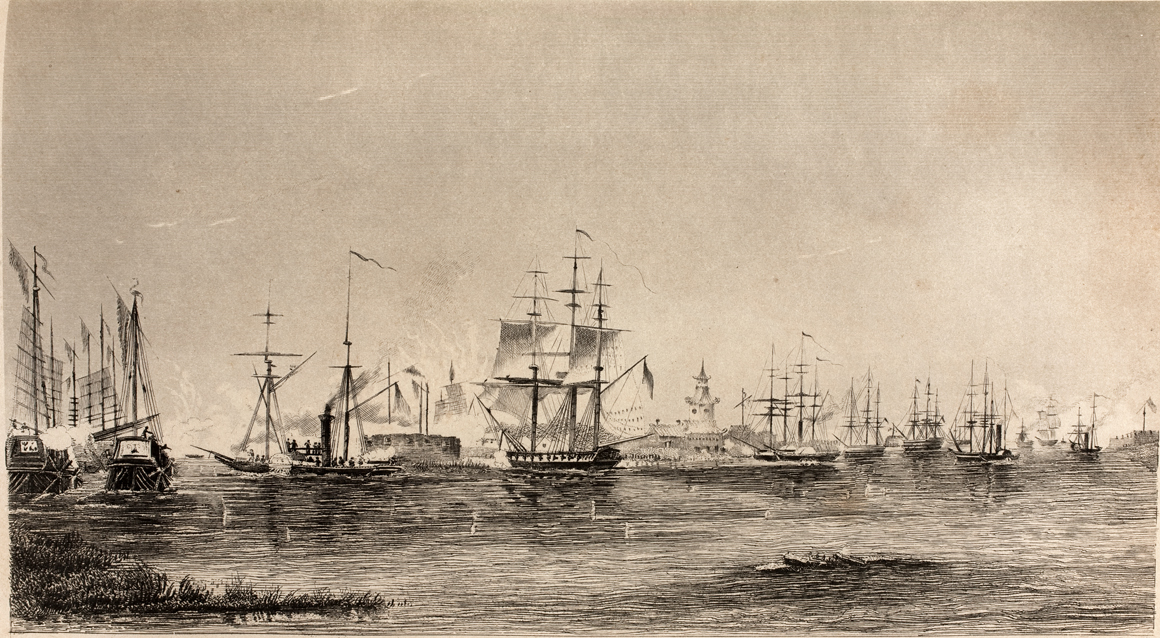
- Battle of Woosung
| Date | 16 June 1842 |
| Location | Woosung River, Jiangsu, China |
| Result | British victory |

Belligerents
| United Kingdom: British East India Company | Qing China |

Commanders and leaders
| Hugh Gough; William Parker | Chen Huacheng † |

Strength
| 14 ships | 19 ships 4,000–5,000 troops |

Casualties and losses
| 3 killed 25 wounded | Hundreds killed or wounded 250 guns captured |

The Battle of Wusong (Woosung) (Chinese: 吳淞戰役) was fought between British and Chinese forces at the entrance of the Wusong River (present-day Huangpu River), Jiangsu province, China, on 16 June 1842, during the First Opium War. The British capture of the towns of Woosung (now Wusong) and Baoshan opened the way to Shanghai, which was captured with little resistance on 19 June.

== Background ==
From Wusong, the British would only have to advance 19 km to capture Shanghai. By doing so, they hoped to cut off tax revenues to Peking and force the Chinese government to capitulate. However, the campaign had to be swift and successful before disease took its toll on British forces, which could also increase domestic opposition in Britain against the war.

== Battle ==
On 13 June, HMS Cornwallis and the British fleet anchored off Wusong. Bombardment of the port began on 16 June, with Cornwallis and the other warships closed inshore, while the transports, laden with troops, stood 4 miles offshore.

Counter fire from 3-mile lines of Chinese fortifications on the north bank of the river caused some casualties, but within two hours British gunfire suppressed the Chinese artillery. The warships' boats were then lowered and started to land the Royal Marines and selected detachments of seamen who eventually seized the fortifications, spiked the guns, and held their positions until the main land force could be brought up from the transports offshore.

Though a majority of the garrison had fled halfway through the battle, the Qing commander, Jiangnan Admiral Chen Huacheng, continued to fight on until he was eventually killed. Afterwards, Liu Guobiao, Chen's commandant and close associate, carried Chen's corpse on his back away from the fray and hid it in a clump of reedy grass to prevent it from being discovered by the British.

== Aftermath ==
By the evening, with Wusong under control, British troops began advancing up the towards Shanghai. Soldiers and landed sailors marched along the left banks of the Wusong River, while others moved in steamers towing small boats. The only opposition was from a shore battery, halfway up the river towards Shanghai, which was eventually silenced by Royal Navy gunfire.

By 18 June, after silencing another shore battery just downriver from Shanghai, the strong force reached the city and occupied it the next day.

== Gallery ==
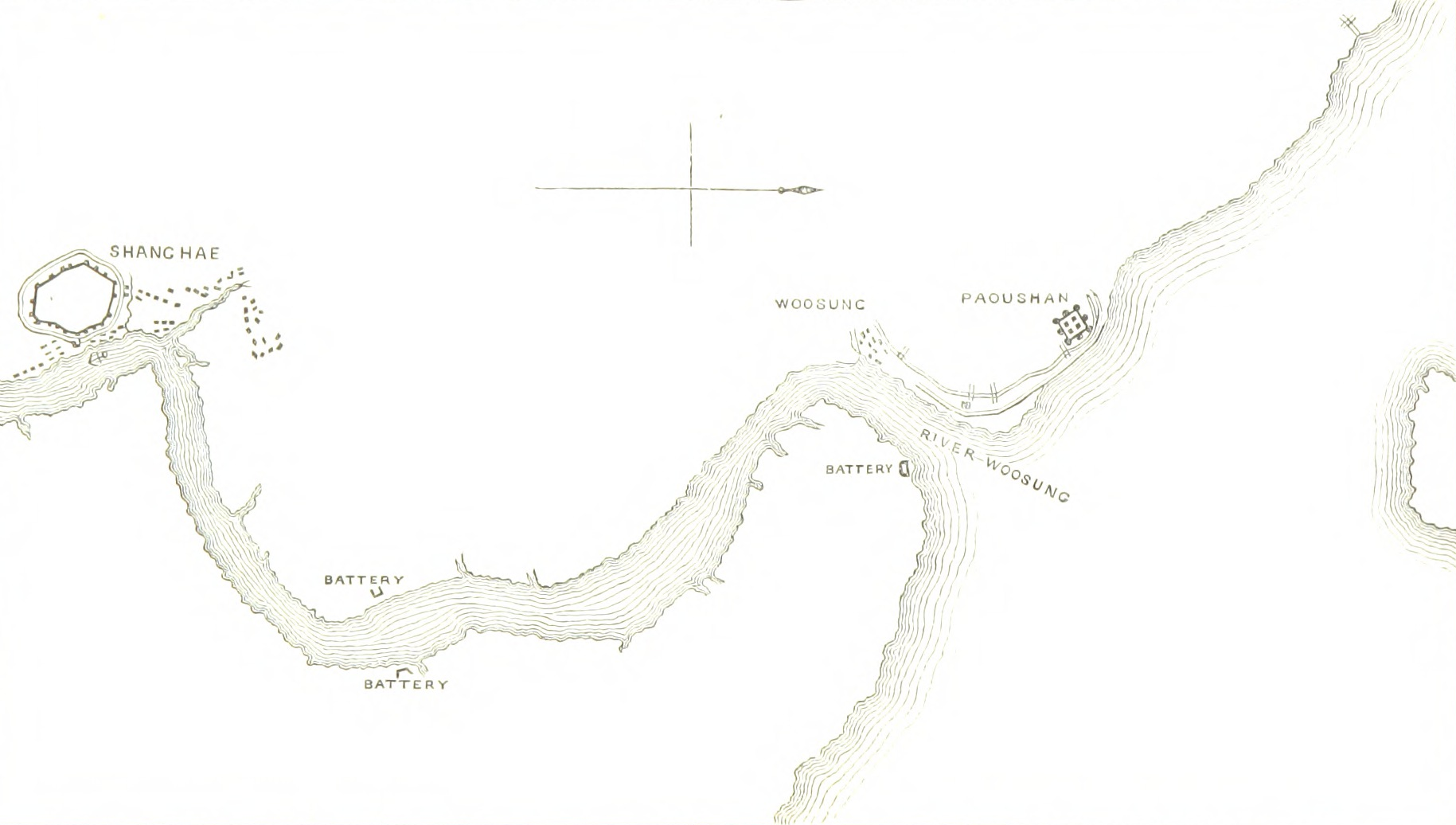
Map of the Woosung River, showing the Chinese batteries

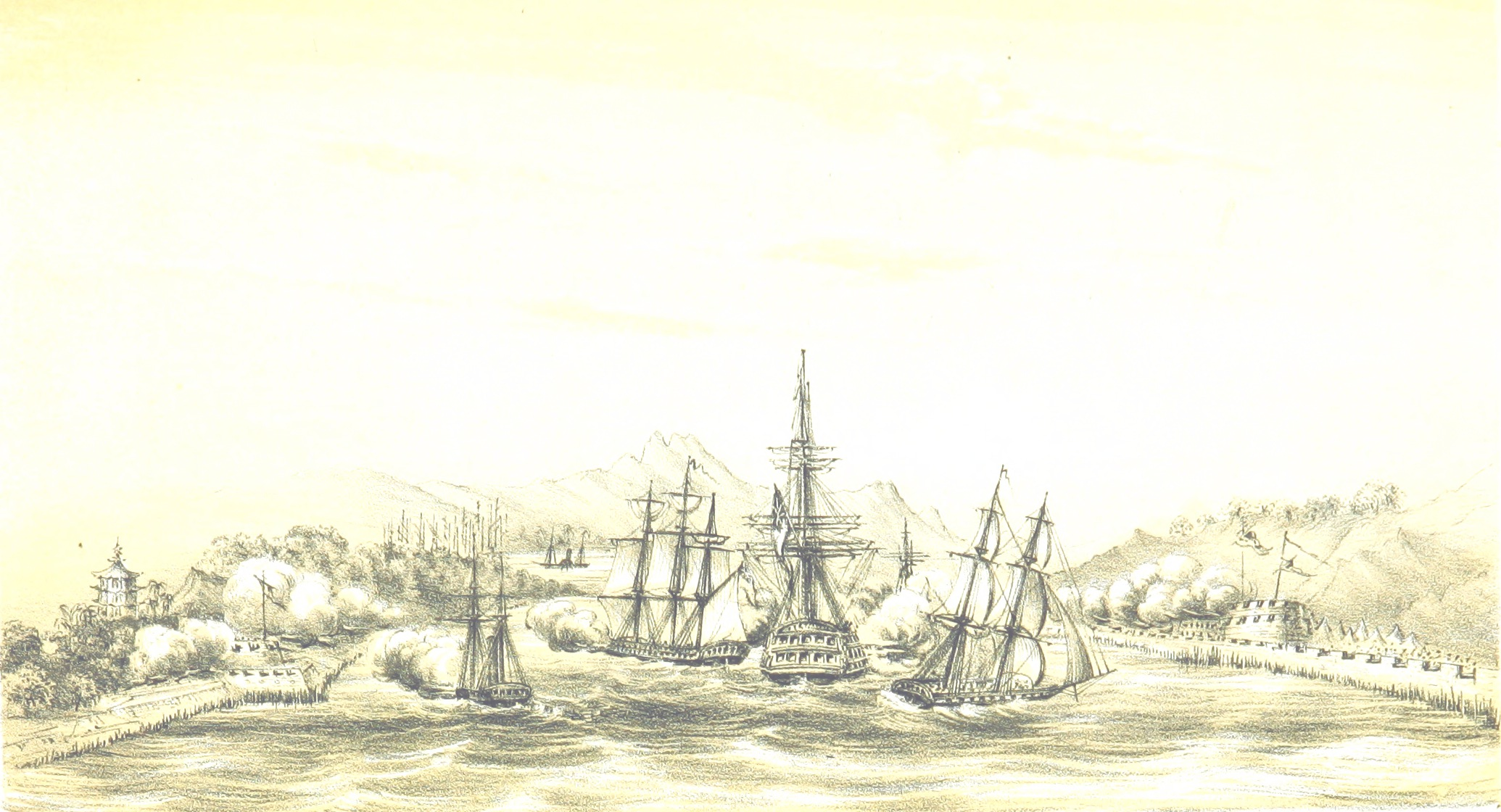
Sketch of naval battle

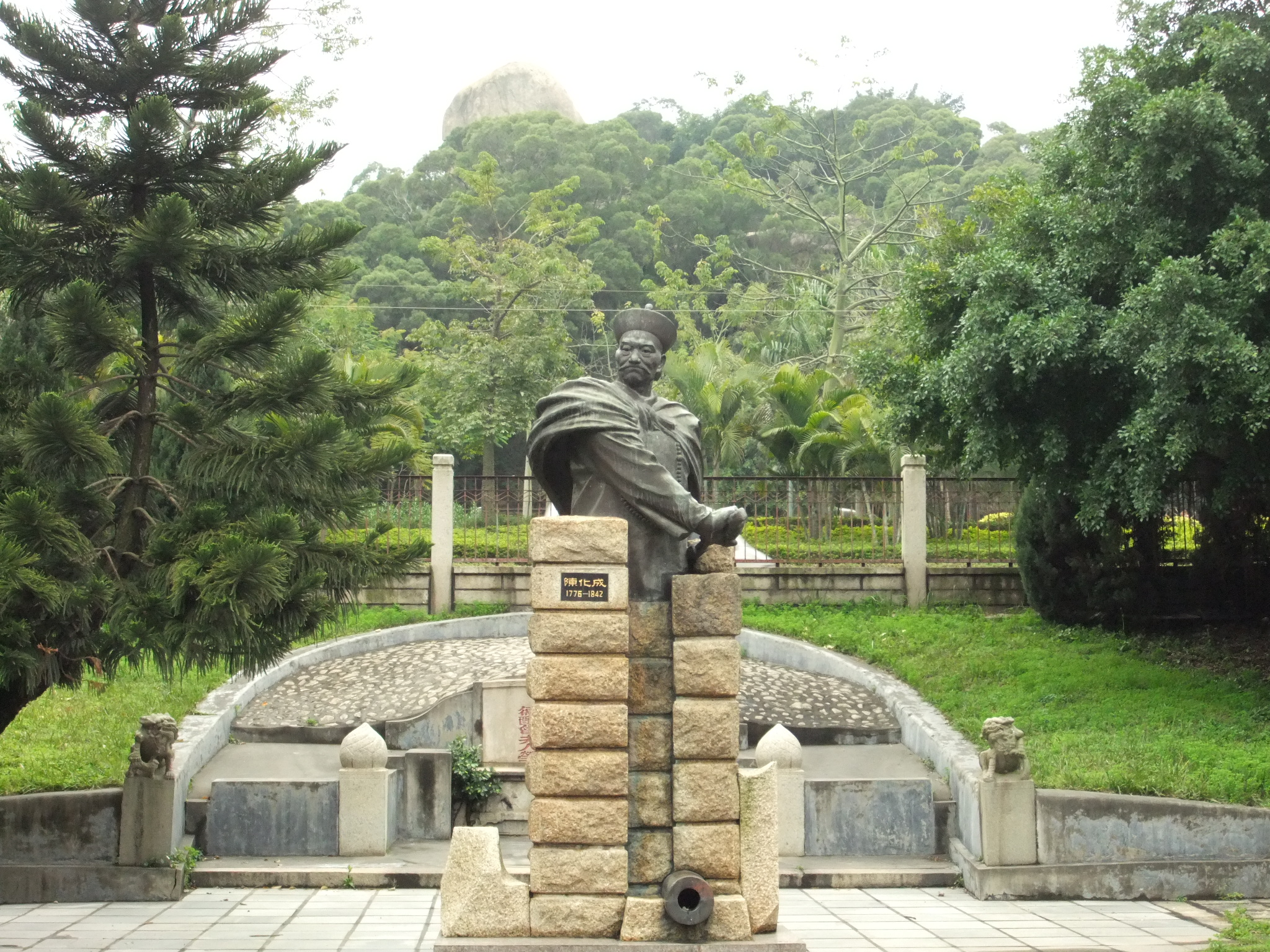
Tomb of Admiral Chen, killed in the battle
