= Fu Tai (constituency) =

- Elected constituency for the Tuen Mun District Council
- Boundary of Fu Tai in Tuen Mun District
- District: Tuen Mun
- Legislative Council constituency: New Territories North West
- Population: 19,298 (2019)
- Electorate: 13,369 (2019)

Current constituency
- Created: 2003
- Number of members: One
- Member: Ho Kwok-ho (EHK)

Fu Tai (Chinese: 富泰) is one of the 31 constituencies in the Tuen Mun District.

Created for the 2003 District Council elections, the constituency returns one district councillor to the Tuen Mun District Council, with an election every four years.

Fu Tai loosely covers areas surrounding Botania Villa, Fu Tai Estate, Fu Tei Ha Tsuen, Fu Tei Sheung Tsuen and Fuk Hang Tsuen in Tuen Mun with an estimated population of 19,298.

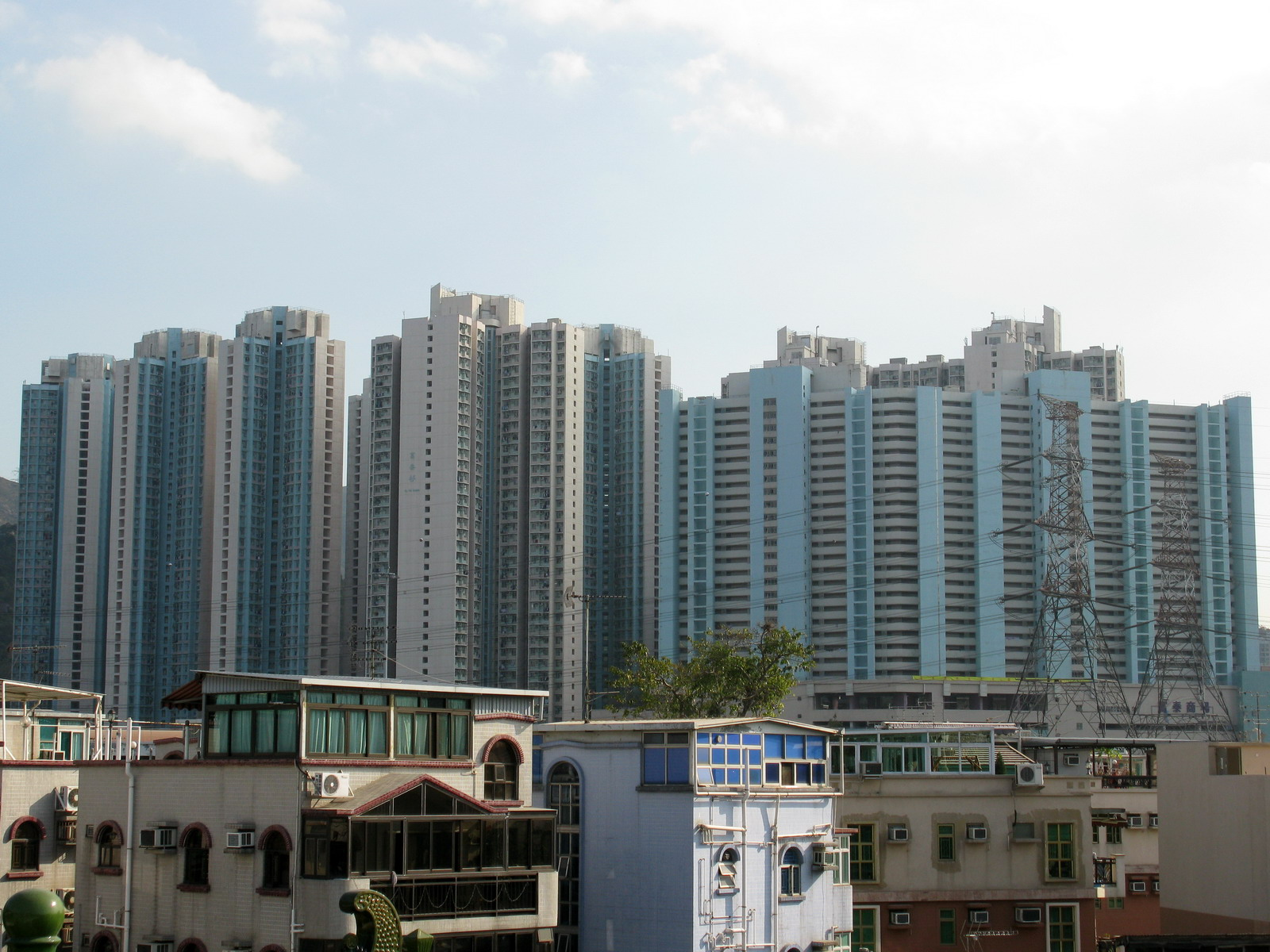
Fu Tai Estate

== Councillors represented ==
Election	Member	Party
2019	Ho Kwok-ho	Empowering Hong Kong

== History of election ==
=== 2015 election ===
In 2015 election, the constituency was contested by Manwell Chan from HKFTU, while the Ho Wai-Cheung from pro-Umbrella group Tuen Mun Community would like to run for the election. Nevertheless, after the nomination period, Ho was discovered for supporting Leung Chun Ying in 2013, which was against the stance of the group. Ho announced that he would quit the election and the group. Yet, candidates were not allowed to quit after the nomination period. Chan subsequently won with more than 70% of votes.

=== 2019 election ===
In the polling day of the 2019 election, the pro-Beijing candidate Manwell Chan were reported to offer illegal transportation services to the voters. The Stand News reported that in Fu Tai constituency, there were some self-claimed voluntary coach services offered to the elderly voters. Some voters said the services was offered by Manwell Chan, a pro-Beijing HKFTU candidates, and said that they were requested to vote for Chan.

== Election results ==
=== 2010s ===
Tuen Mun District Council Election, 2019: Fu Tai
Party	Candidate	Votes	%	±%
Empowering HK	Ho Kwok-ho	5,590	61.51	
FTU	Manwell Chan	3,461	38.49	
Majority		2,129	23.02	
Turnout		9,083	67.99	
Empowering HK gain from FTU		Swing		
