= Shing Wong Temple, Shau Kei Wan =

Coordinates: 22.277869°N 114.230627°E

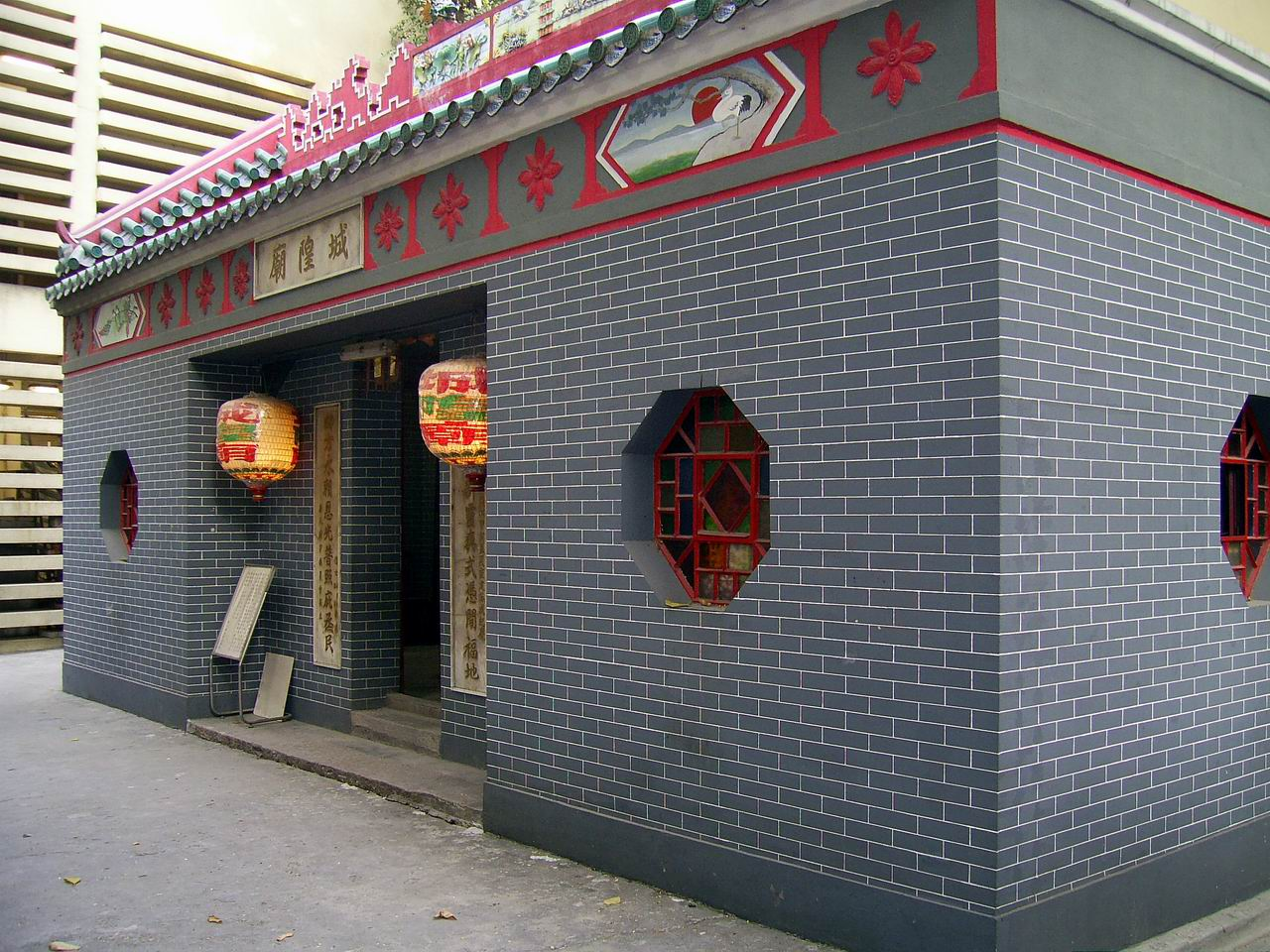
Shing Wong Temple, Shau Kei Wan

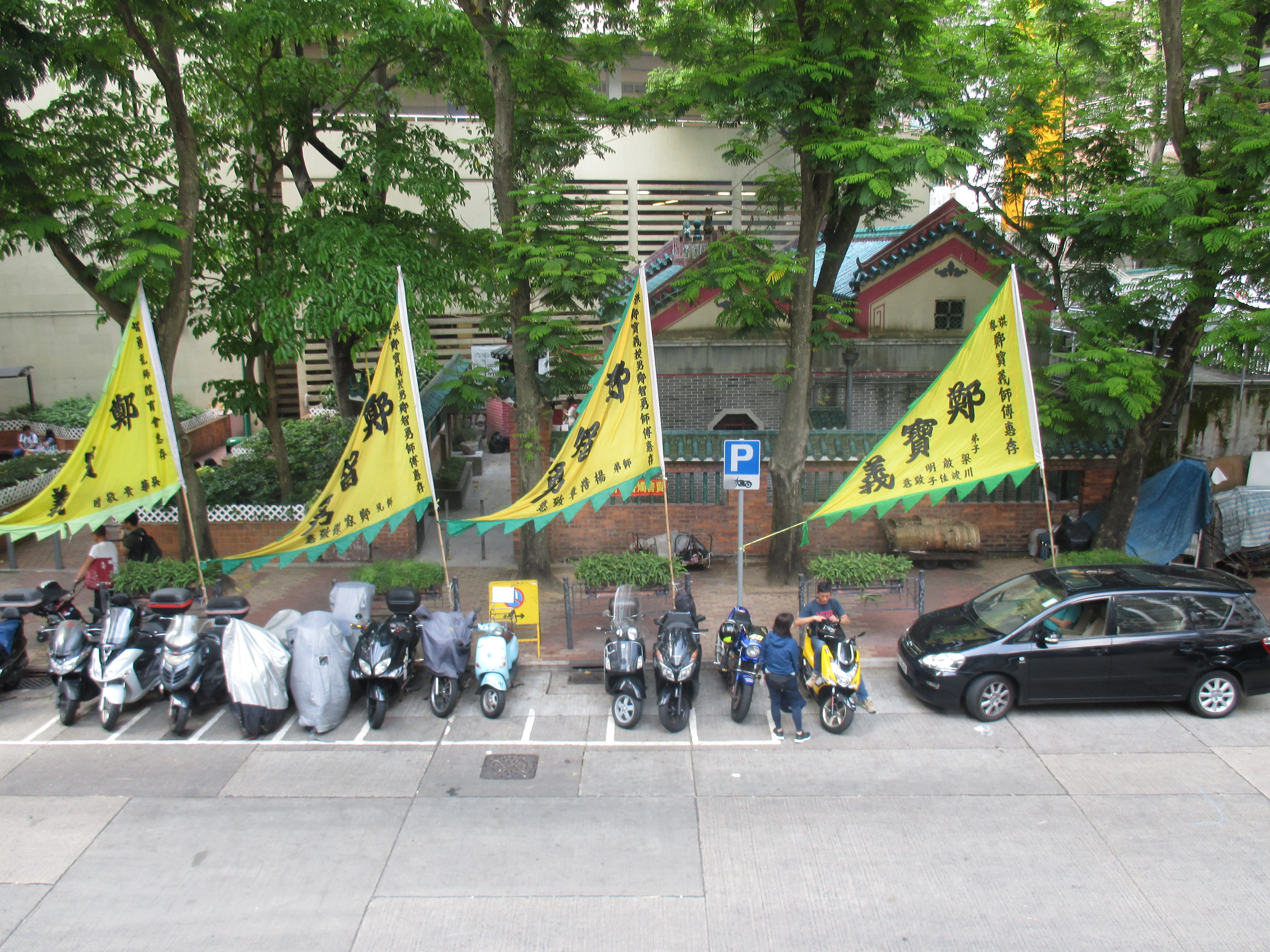
Shing Wong Temple, Shau Kei Wan, viewed from Kam Wa Street

Shing Wong Temple (Chinese: 筲箕灣城隍廟) is a temple in Kam Wa Street, Shau Kei Wan, Eastern District, Hong Kong.

The temple was built in 1877. Formerly named Fook Tak Tsz (福德祠), it was renamed "Shing Wong Temple" after an expansion project in 1974.

The temple is managed by the Chinese Temples Committee.

The temple is listed as a Grade III historic building.

The interior of the temple can be explored with Google Street View.

== See also ==
- City God (China)
