= Fu Tei =

Area of Tuen Mun District, Hong Kong

Coordinates: 22.411867°N 113.982269°E

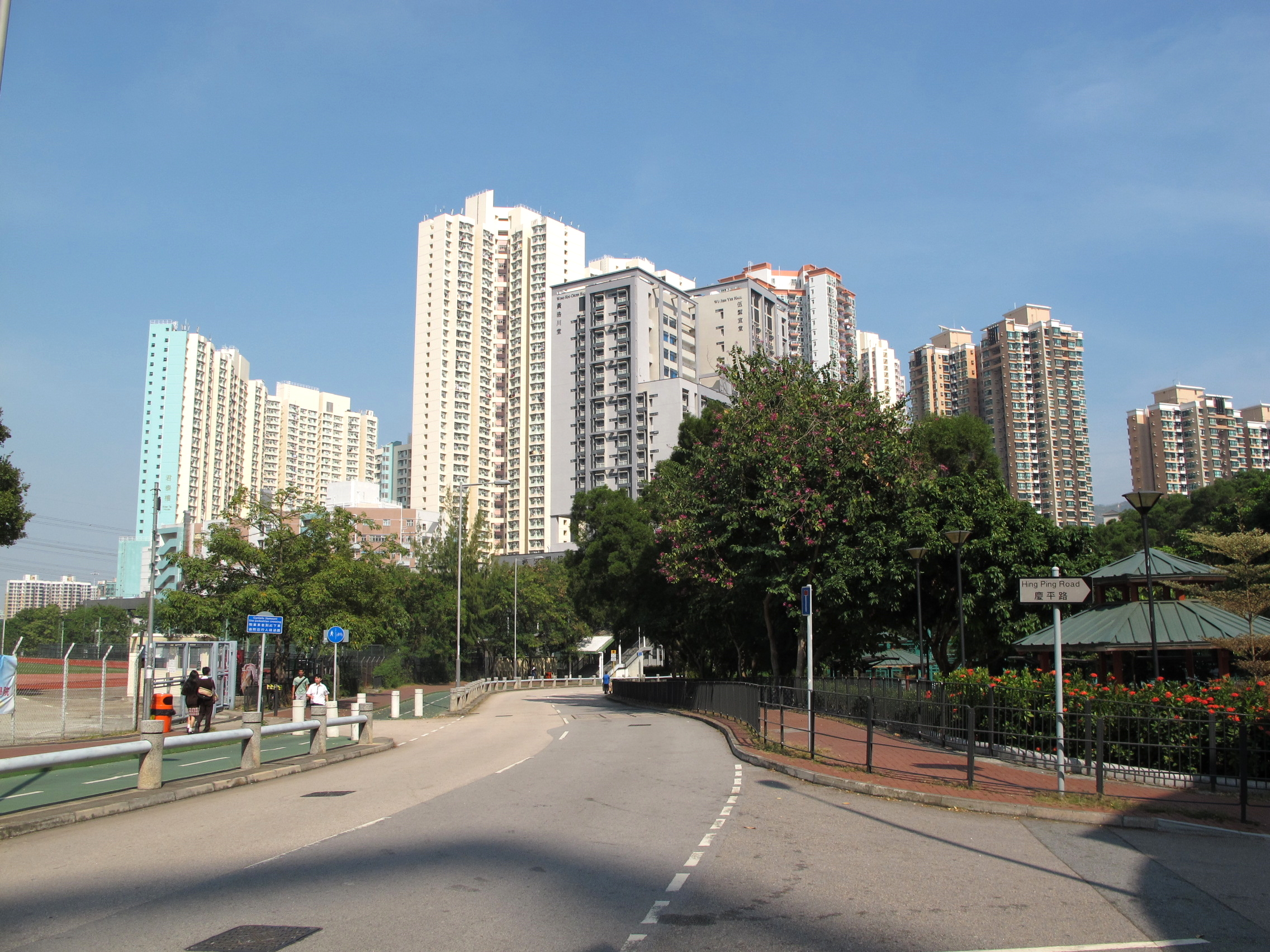
View of Fu Tei.

Fu Tei (Chinese: 虎地) is an area of Tuen Mun District in Hong Kong.

== Features ==
- Fu Tai Estate
- Lingnan University
- Fu Tei Tsuen, a village that comprises the two hamlets of Fu Tei Ha Tsuen (虎地下村; 'Fu Tei Lower Village') and Fu Tei Sheung Tsuen (虎地上村; 'Fu Tei Upper Village')
- Lam Tei Reservoir
- Fung Tei stop

== Education ==
Fu Tei is in Primary One Admission (POA) School Net 71. Within the school net are multiple aided schools (operated independently but funded with government money); no government schools are in the school net.
