= Hefei City God Temple =

Heritage building in Hefei, China

The Hefei City God Temple (Chinese: 合肥城隍庙), historically known as the Luzhou Prefecture City God Temple (Chinese: 庐州府城隍庙), is a Taoist temple complex in Hefei, Anhui Province, China. It was built in 1051 during the Northern Song Dynasty to honor Sun Jue (Chinese: 孙觉), who was Luzhou's first prefect. The still standing buildings were made by Li Hezhang, a Gansu and Liangzhou military commissioner, five years into the Guangxu Emperor's reign during the Qing dynasty.

== Gallery ==
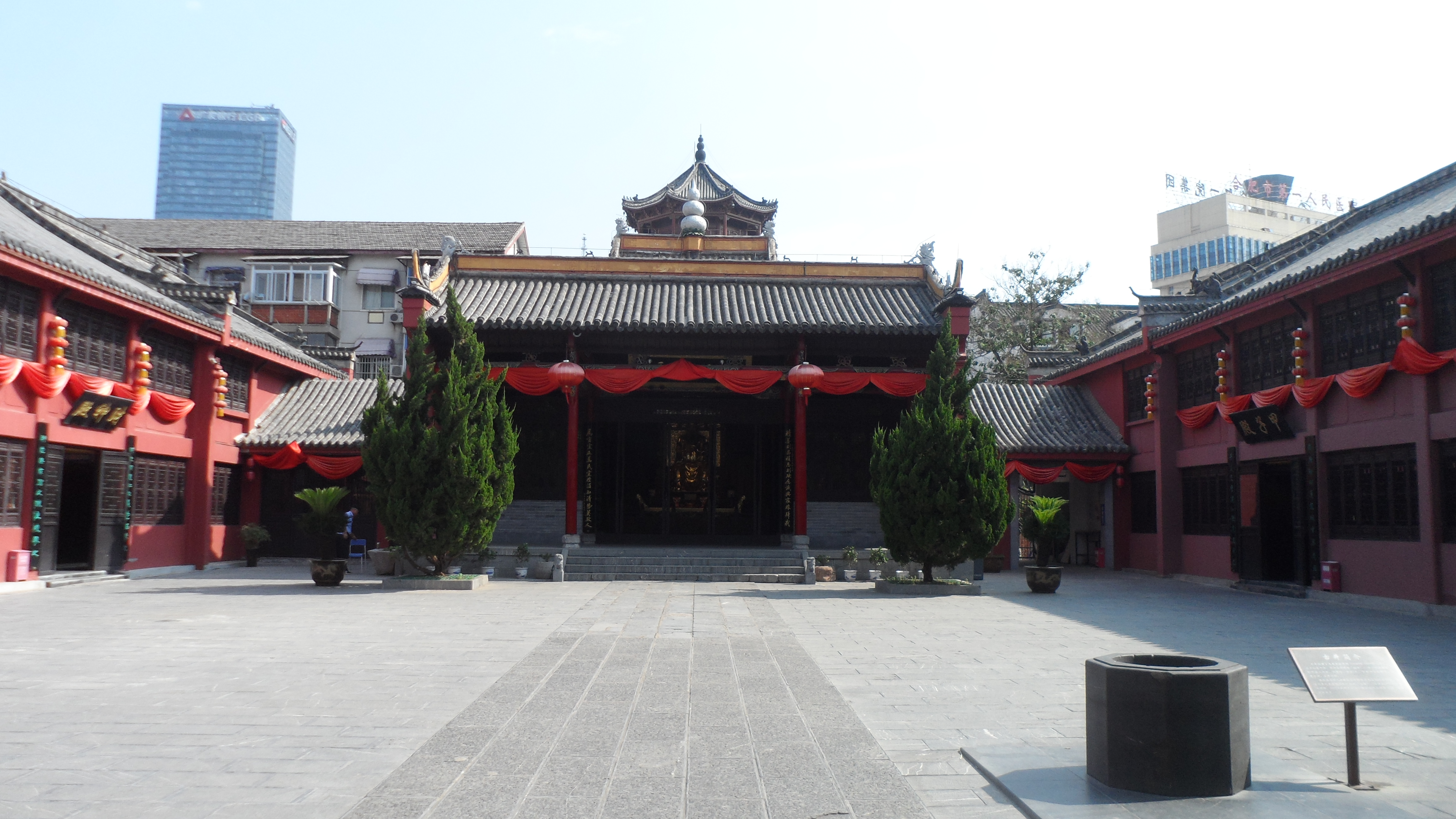
Main Hall

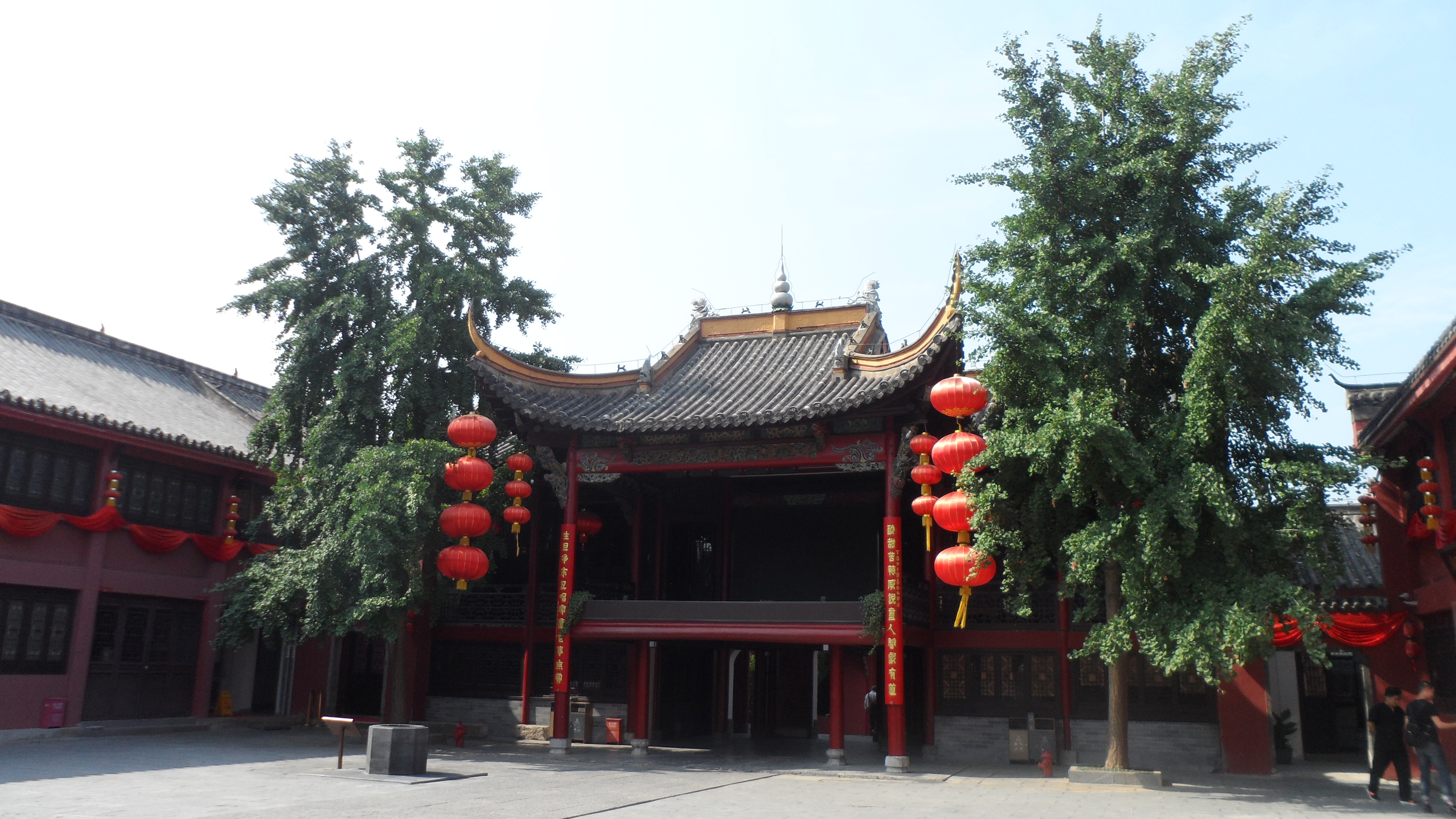
Interior

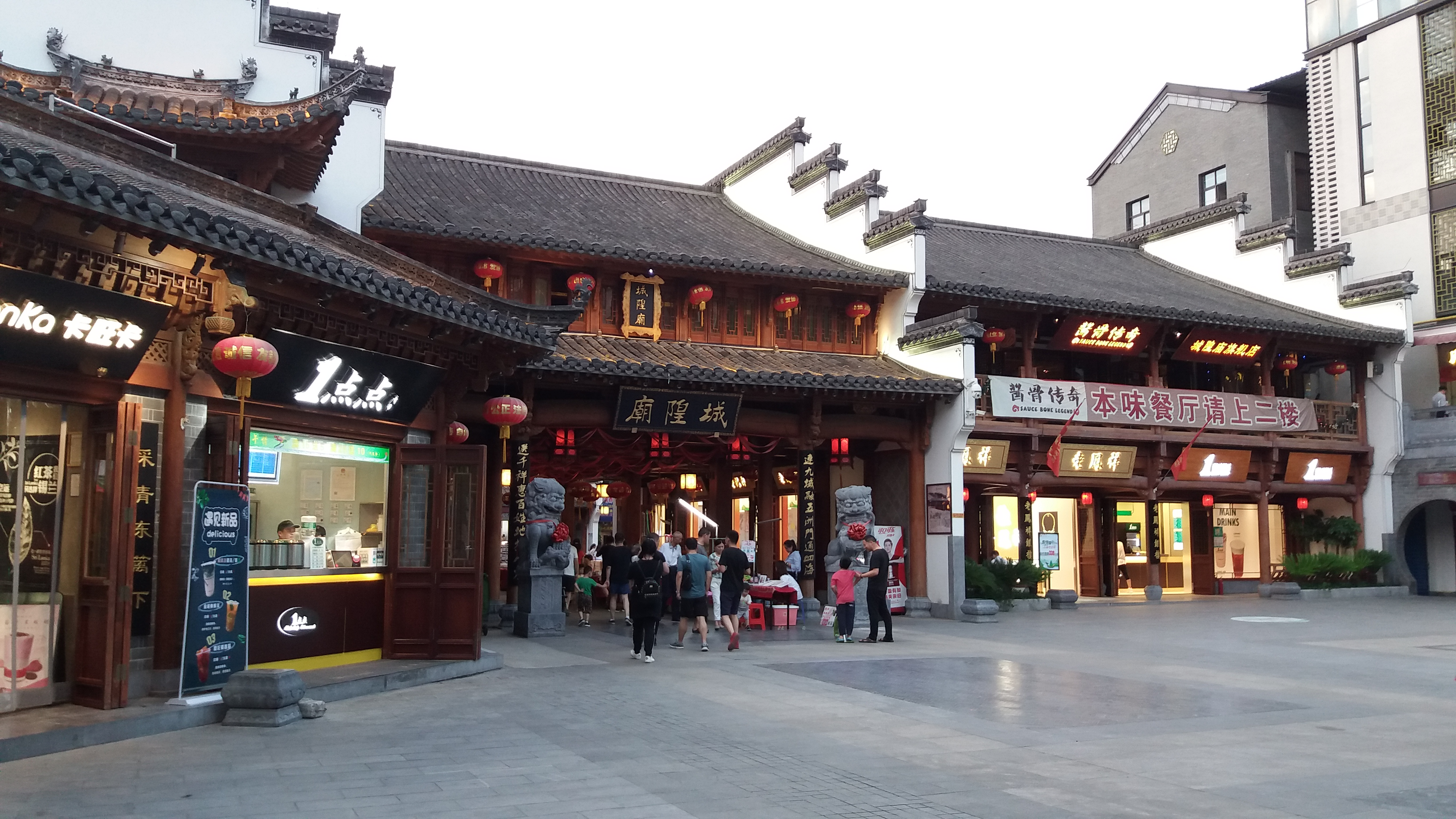
Market

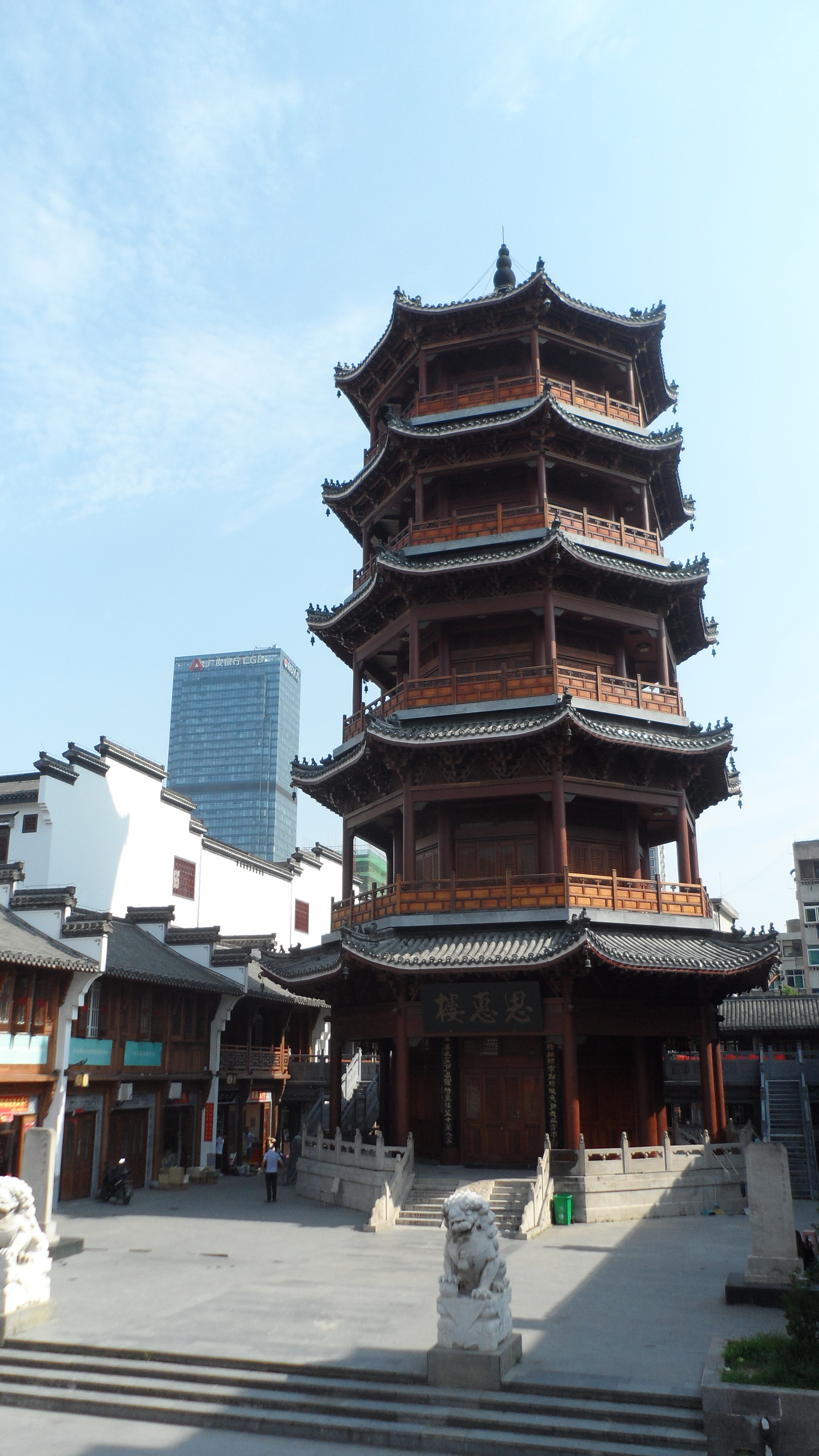
Sihui Temple
