= Fu Tei Tsuen =

Coordinates: 22.413892°N 113.987071°E

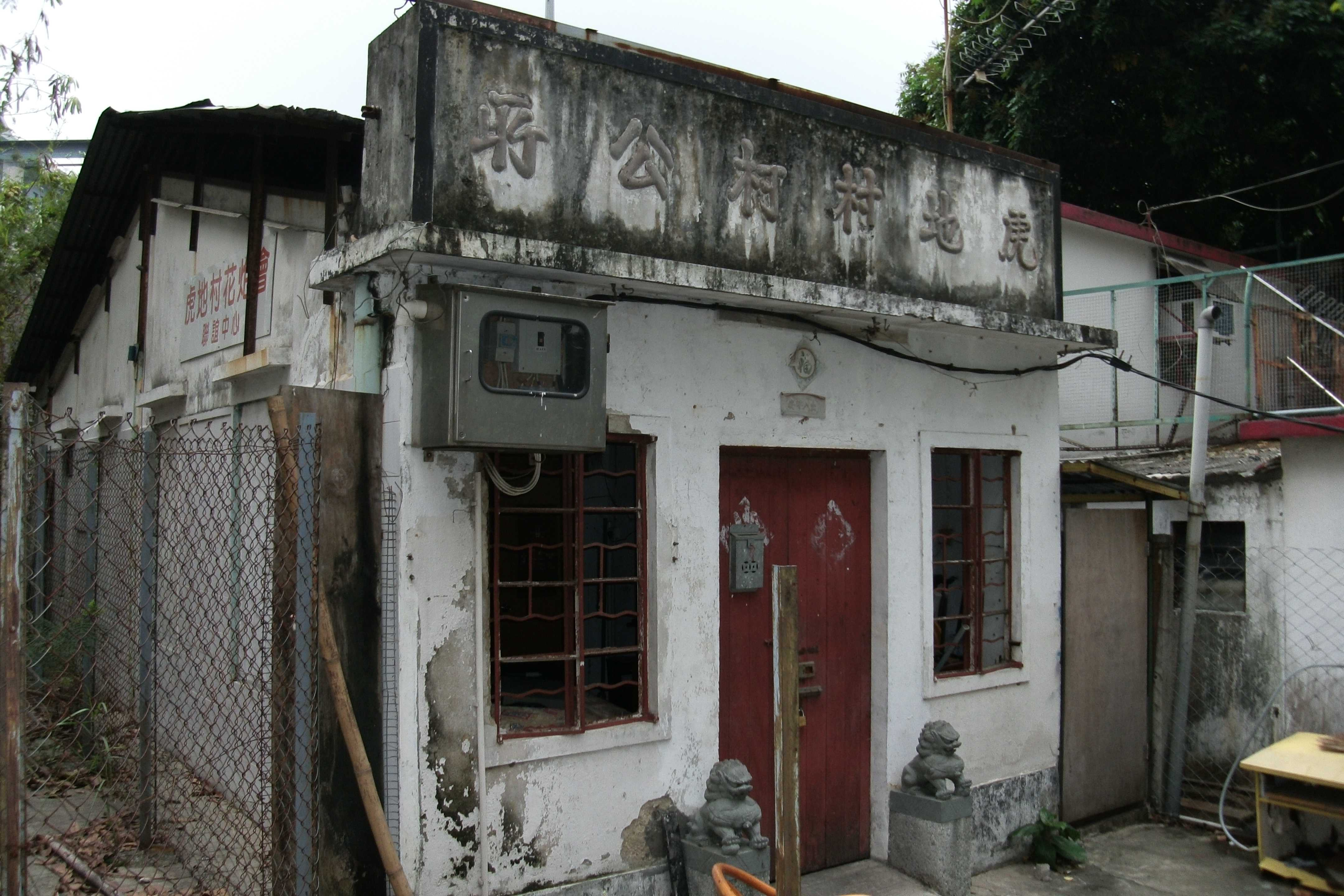
Fu Tei Village Office.

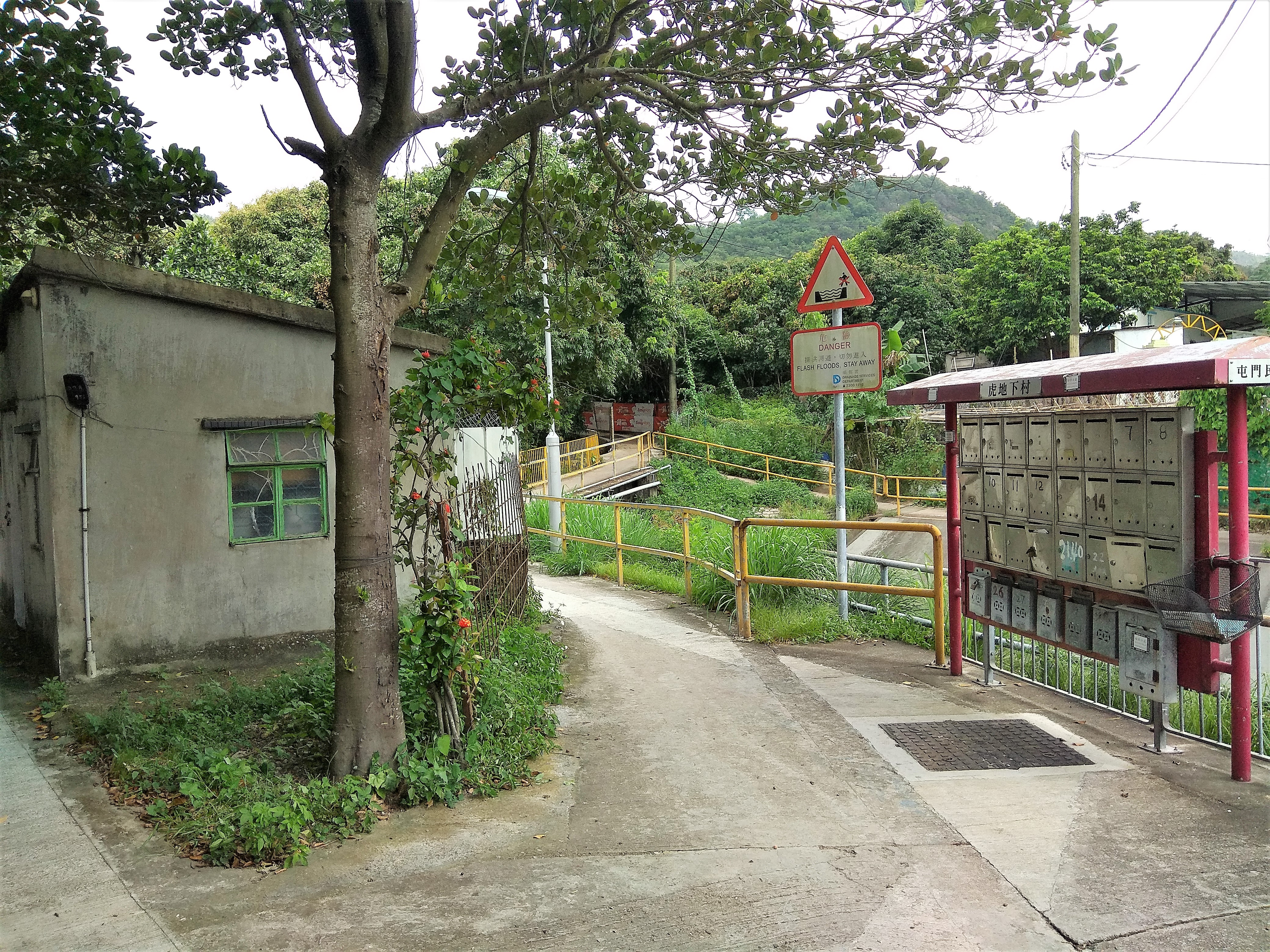
Fu Tei Ha Tsuen.

Fu Tei Tsuen (Chinese: 虎地村) is a village in the Fu Tei area of Tuen Mun District, Hong Kong. It comprises the two hamlets of Fu Tei Ha Tsuen (虎地下村; 'Fu Tei Lower Village') and Fu Tei Sheung Tsuen (虎地上村; 'Fu Tei Upper Village').

== Administration ==
Fu Tei Tsuen is a recognized village under the New Territories Small House Policy. It is one of the 36 villages represented within the Tuen Mun Rural Committee. For electoral purposes, Fu Tei Tsuen is part of the Fu Tai constituency.
