= Pun Tao Kong =

Deity among Chinese diaspora

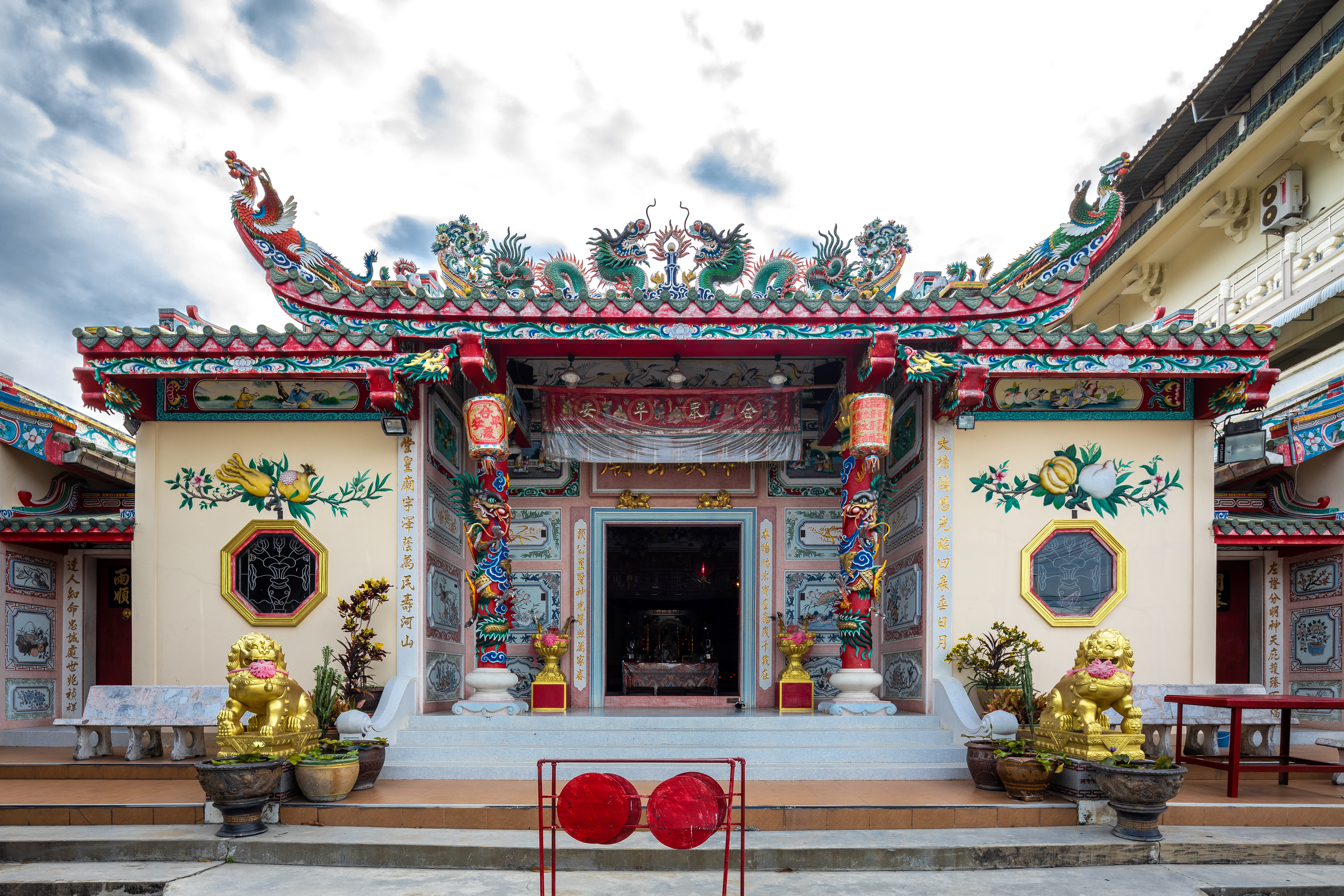
Pun Tao Kong shrine in Phasi Charoen district, Bangkok

Pun Tao Kong (Chinese: 本頭公; pinyin: Běn tóu gōng) or Lao Pun Tao Kong (Chinese: 老本頭公; pinyin: Lǎo běn tóu gōng; lit. 'traditional senior chief') is a deity who is highly respected and broadly regarded by overseas Chinese but does not exist in China. He is related and similar to Tudigong. Pun Tao Kong beliefs and shrines exist in some countries such as Thailand, Malaysia, Vietnam, Cambodia, Singapore.

There are many myths that tell of his origins, for example, it is believed that he was a frontline warrior of commander Zheng He, then he traveled to Southeast Asia with Zheng He. While some stories said that he moved to Luzon island, some records mentioned that he died there, while some did not mention about that.

It is possible that he was a symbol or representative of the first Chinese immigrants to Southeast Asia. The Chinese immigrants likely chose to worship a deity close to them as a tutelar.

In Thailand, there are shrines of Pun Tao Kong spread throughout the capital Bangkok, and in various cities such as Khon Kaen or Samut Sakhon. His idols often wore military uniforms or were old men. While some shrines may use the image of Vishnu as Pun Tao Kong.

Pun Tao Kong is usually worshiped among the Teochew people, there are some in the Hoklo. While the Hainanese and Hakka people do not have this belief at all. And it is said that he is the Chinese god with the largest number of shrines in Bangkok.

According to Somchai Kwangthongpanich, an expert on Sinology. Evidence of the oldest Pun Thao Kong shrine in Thailand, it has existed since the Ayutthaya period (more than 250 years). In those days, there were many Pun Tao Kong shrines in Ayutthaya in Chinese communities like Yan Nai Kai Market or Pak Nam Mae Bia (present-day in Ho Rattanachai Sub-District, Phra Nakhon Si Ayutthaya District).

However, the largest and one of the oldest shrines of him is on Song Wat Road in Chinatown area. In the olden days, when people began to build Pun Tao Gong shrines at other places, they would ask for incense from here.

Sometimes Pun Tao Kong is known as Pun Tao Ma (Chinese: 本頭媽; pinyin: Běn tóu mā) a tutelar goddess. The shrines of Pun Tao Ma also spread in different places like Pun Tao Kong, sometimes both of them were worshiped together.

== See also ==
- Tudigong
