= City God Temple of Pingyao =

Taoist temple in Shanxi Province, China

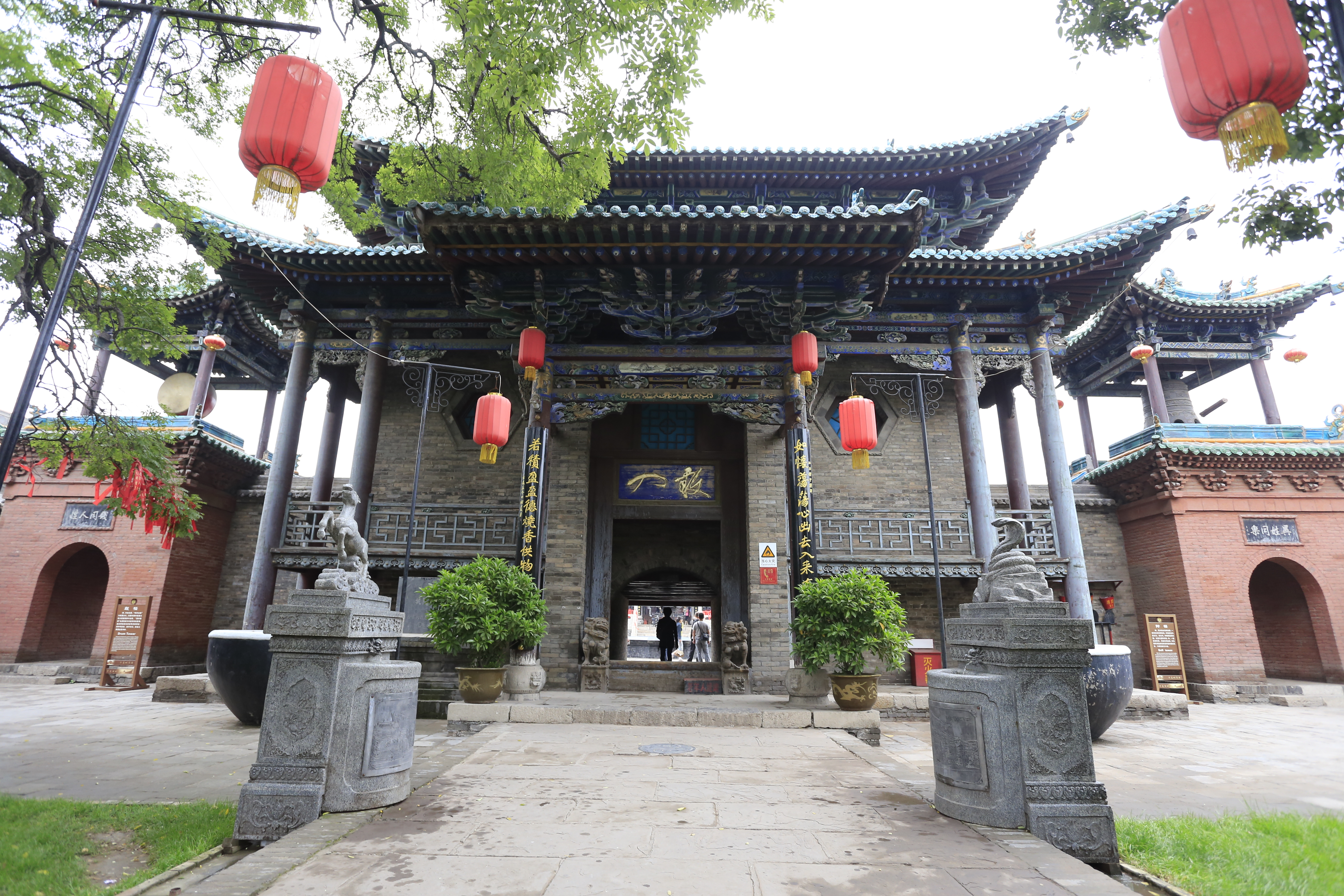
Front hall

The Temple of the City God of Pingyao (simplified Chinese: 平遥城隍庙; traditional Chinese: 平遙城隍廟; pinyin: Píngyáo Chéng Huáng miào) is a well-preserved Taoist temple located in Pingyao County, Shanxi Province, China. The temple consists of three separate temples on a complex, covering over 7,300 square meters.

== History ==
Constructed during the Song dynasty (960-1279), the temple complex has undergone two major renovations due to fire in 1544 and 1859. In 1859, during the reign of the Xianfeng Emperor, a fire destroyed the structures of the temple complex. In 1864, donations from locals and rich businessmen helped rebuild the structures in accordance to Song structures, but with Qing-era styling.

== Complex ==
The temple holds several smaller temples:

- Temple of the City God
  - It has numerous additions such as the Hall of the City God, Theatre Hall, and Sleep Hall. The Hall of the City God is the court of the law of the city god.
- Caishen temple
  - This temple is dedicated to the God of Wealth Caishen. In this temple, there are numerous figures that has dedicated shrines.
- Zaojun temple
  - This temple is dedicated to the Kitchen God.
