= Chen Huacheng =

Qing admiral (1776–1842)

Chen Huancheng
- 陳化成
- Portrait of Chen Huacheng on display at the Shanghai History Museum
- Born: 1776; Tong'an District, Fujian, Qing Empire
- Died: June 16, 1842 (aged 65–66); Wusong Ancient Fort, Shanghai, Qing Empire
- Military career
- Branch: Imperial Chinese Navy
- Rank: Jiangnan Admiral
- Conflicts: First Opium War; Battle of Woosung †

Chen Huancheng (Chinese: 陳化成; pinyin: Chén Tiānhuá; 1776–1842) was a 19th-century military leader of Qing China. He served as the provincial military leader in Jiangnan Province before being killed in the First Opium War.

== Biography ==
Chen joined the Imperial Army at a young age, in which he served as a standard bearer. Unlike some of his contemporaries, he rose from the ranks of the army to a command position without taking the customary Wu Keju Imperial Examinations. His early promotions were due to his success in suppressing piracy.

In 1830, Chen was promoted to Admiral of Fujian Province by the Daoguang Emperor. During this time, he was stationed in Xiamen. He was promoted again in 1840 when he became a Jiangnan Admiral, the highest rank in the Imperial Navy.

During the First Opium War, Chen commanded the Chinese defenses at the mouth of the Yangtze River. He swore to defend the waterway and began to fortify his position against British incursions. On 16 June 1842, a British fleet sailed up the Yangtze and began to bombard Huacheng's position at Wusong. While commanding the Chinese fort there, Chen was killed by either naval artillery or in hand-to-hand combat with the British.

=== Legacy ===
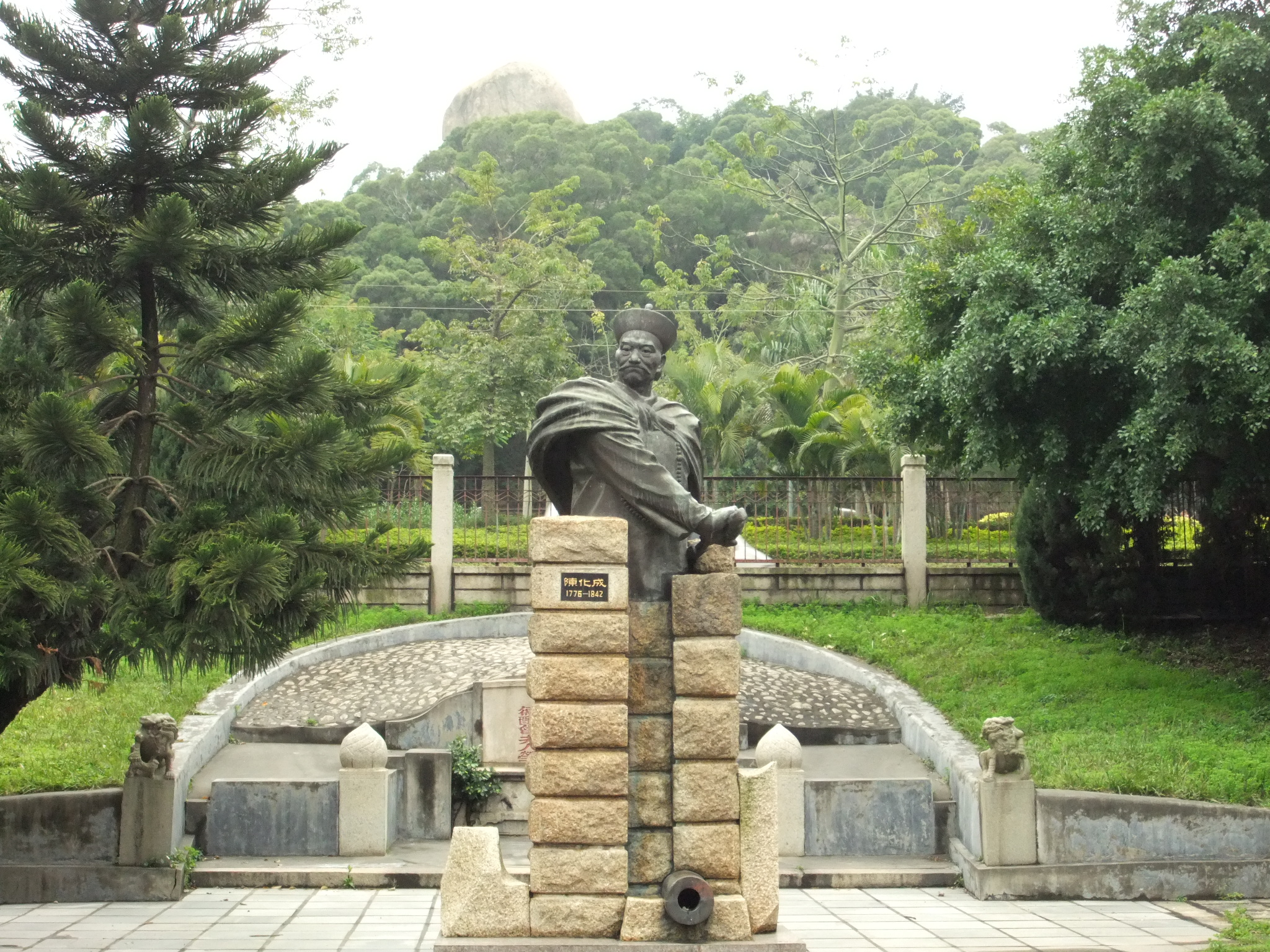
Chen Huancheng's tomb

Chen was declared a national hero after his death. A tomb and museum are erected in his honor in Shanghai.
