= Wonmul Oreum =

Mountain in Jeju Province, South Korea

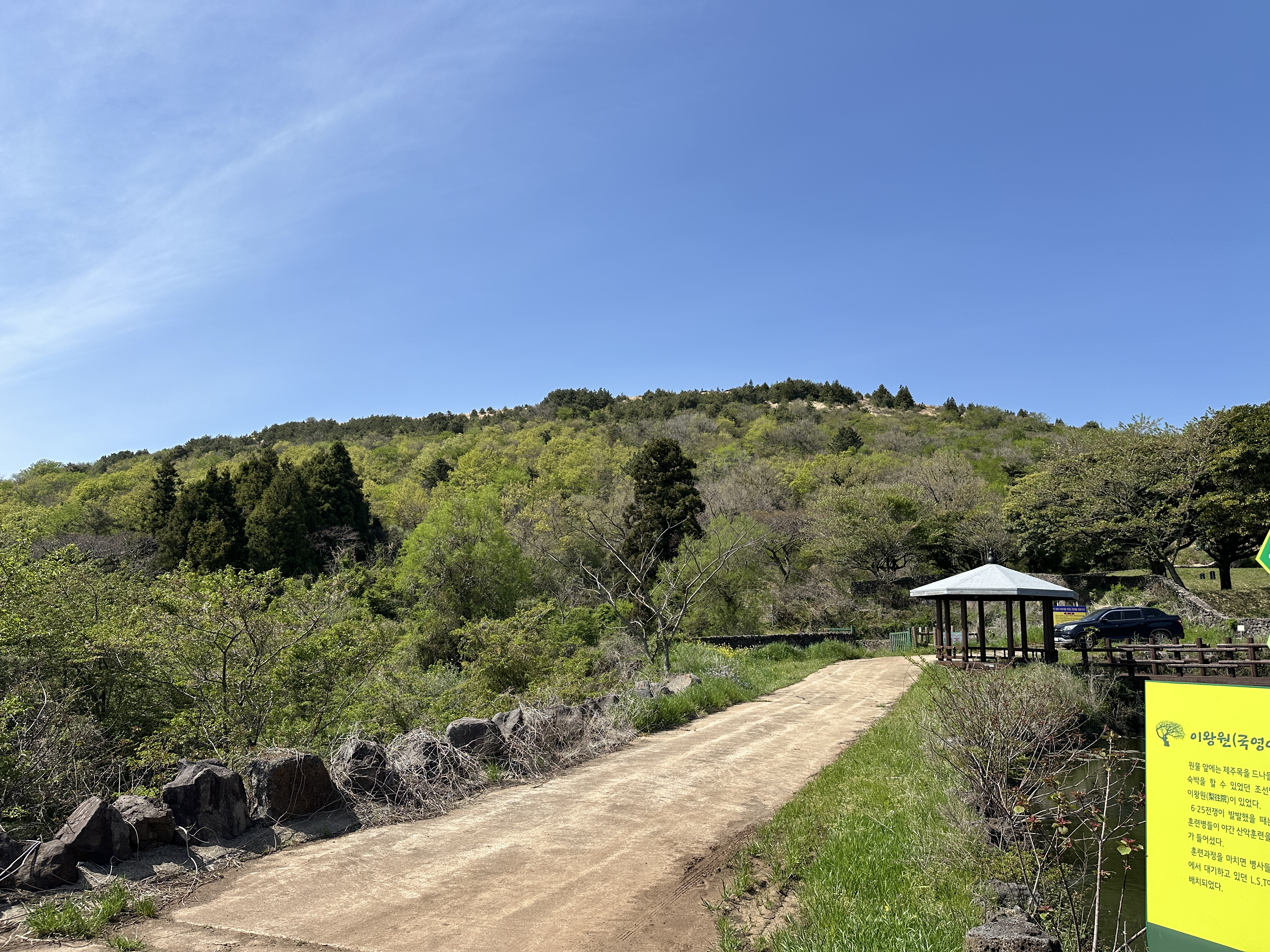
- View of the oreum from its base (2026)

Highest point
- Coordinates: 33.320°N 126.347°E

Geography

Korean name
- Hangul: 원물오름
- RR: Wonmuroreum
- MR: Wŏnmurorŭm

Wonsuak
- Hangul: 원수악
- Hanja: 院水岳; 元水岳
- RR: Wonsuak
- MR: Wŏnsuak

Wonmul Oreum (Korean: 원물오름), also called Wonsuak, is an oreum (small extinct volcano) in Andeok-myeon, Seogwipo, Jeju Province, South Korea.

The origin of the oreum's name is uncertain. It is likely named after a still-extant spring at its base.

The oreum has a height of 98m and elevation of 458.5m. Its circumference is 3,369m and its area is 584,056m^{2}. There is a volcanic crater at the summit. It has a hiking trail on it; the hike was described as one reviewer as brief and not strenuous. The reviewer praised the view from the top. There is a parking lot at the trailhead.

== Gallery ==
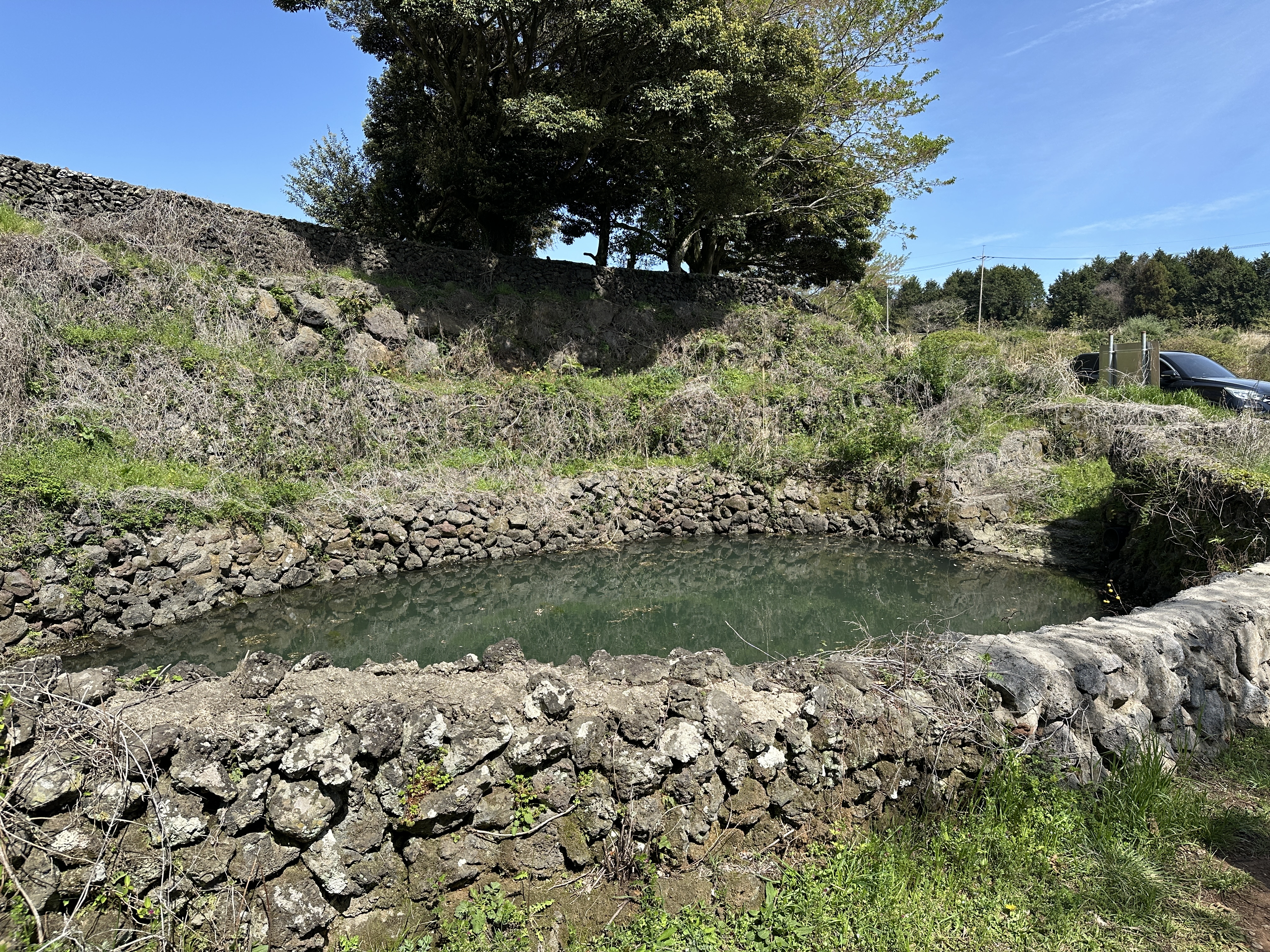
Pond at its base (2026)

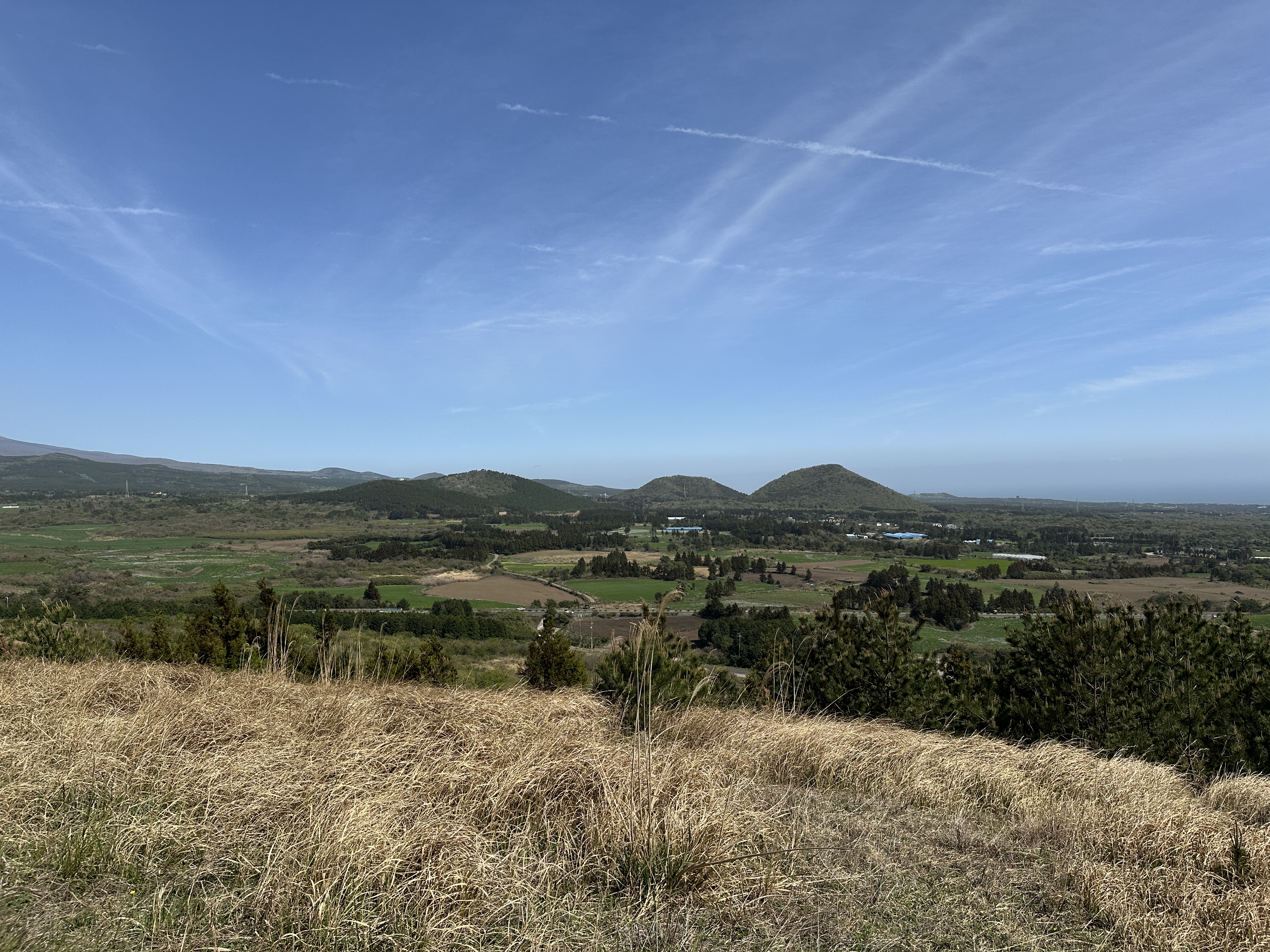
View from the top, facing southwest (2026)

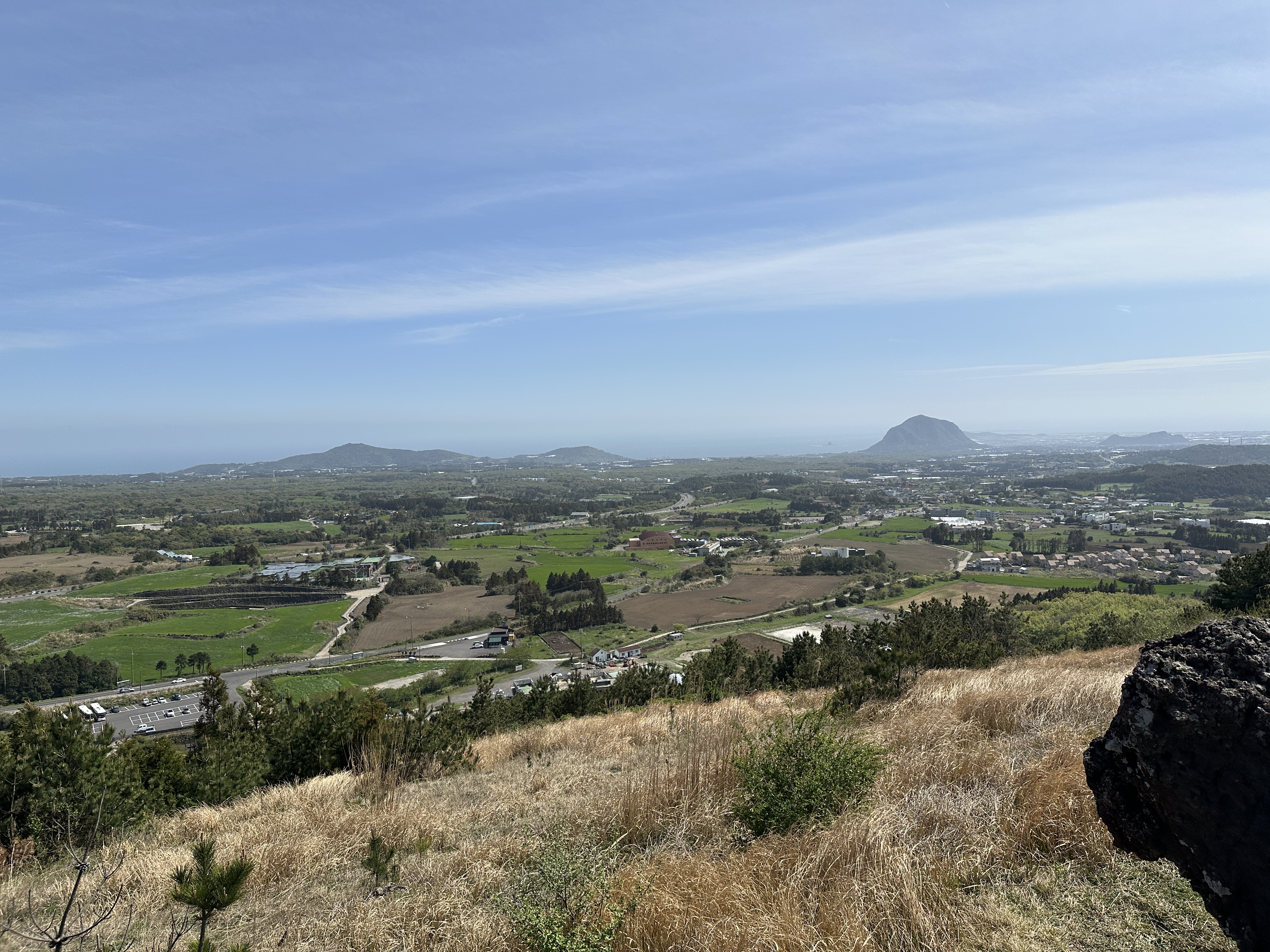
View from the top, facing southeast (2026)

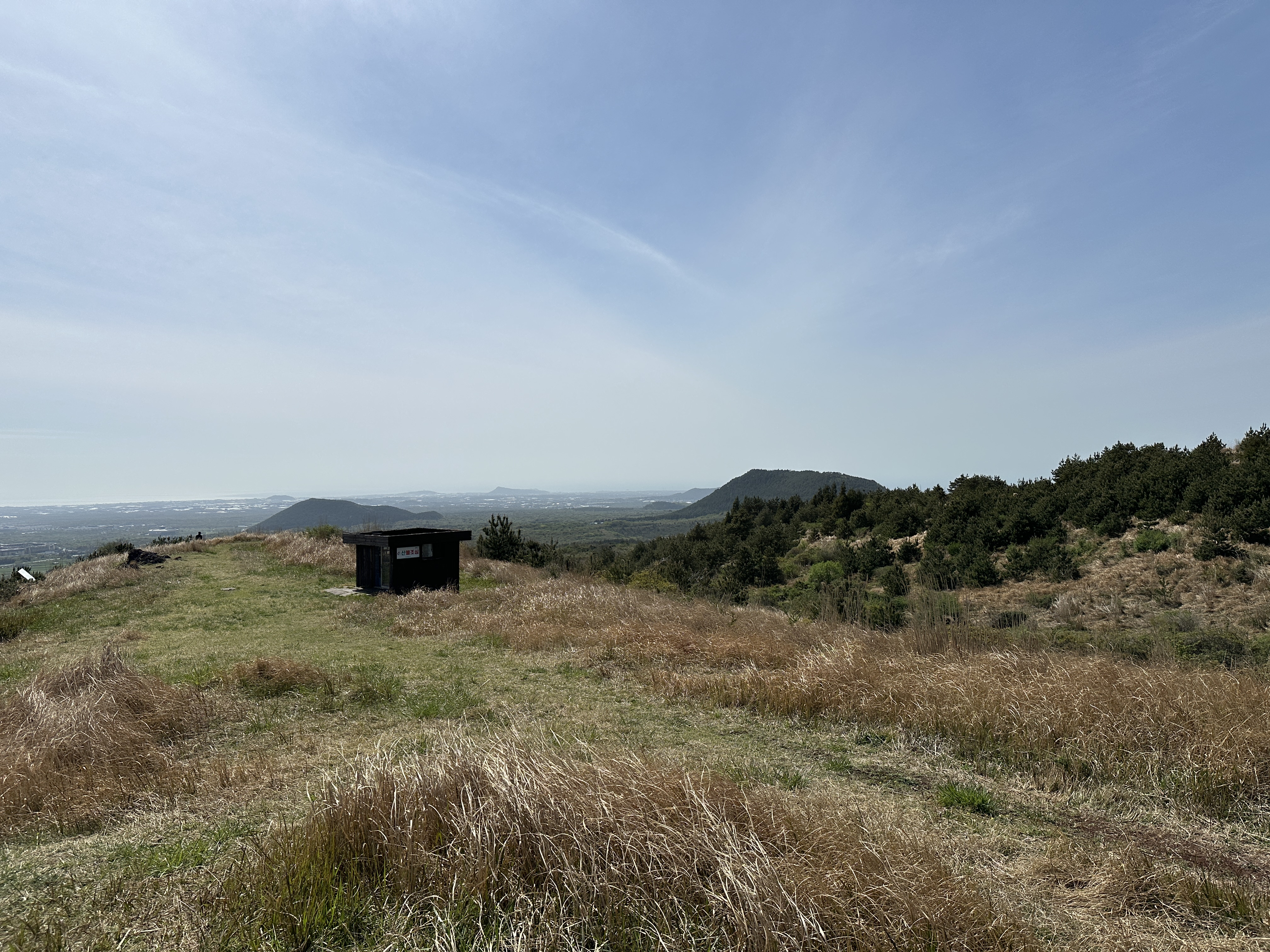
View of the summit (2026)
