= Dodubong =

Hill in Jeju City, South Korea

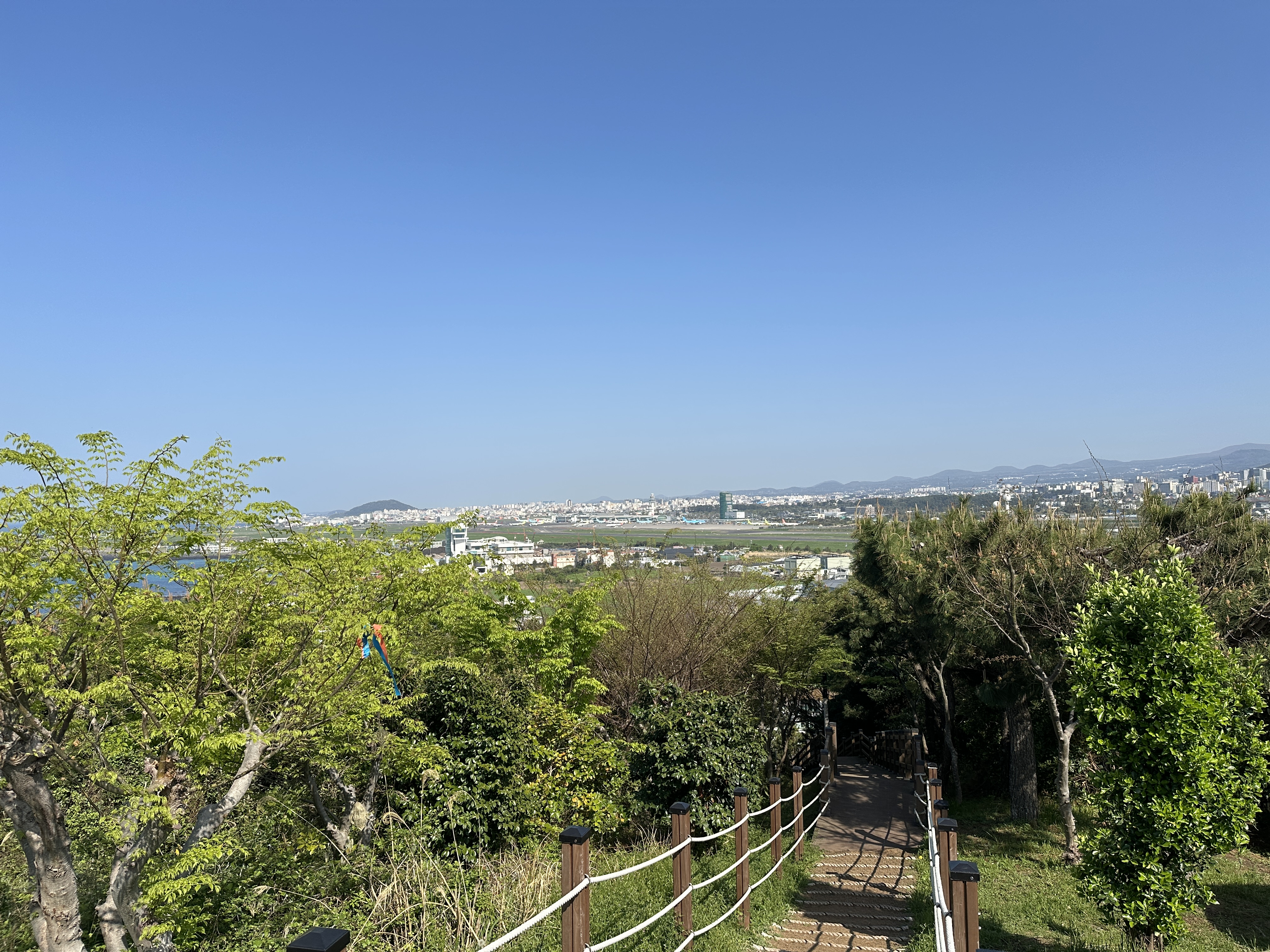
- View from a path on the hill (2026)

Highest point
- Coordinates: 33.5075°N 126.4683°E

Geography

Korean name
- Hangul: 도두봉
- Hanja: 道頭峯
- RR: Dodubong
- MR: Todubong

Dodubong (Korean: 도두봉) is an oreum (small extinct volcano) in Jeju City, Jeju Province, South Korea. It has a height of 67m, circumference of 1,090m, and area of 8,253m^{2}.

It also goes by several other names, including Dodeul Oreum (도들오름), Dowonbong (도원봉), and Dodori Oreum (도도리오름). It was historically also called Dodorisan (도도리산) and Dodoriak (도도리악). It is located on the Doduri Coast right next to Jeju International Airport, next to Dodu Village (도두 마을).

The remains of a beacon tower called Dowon Bongsu (도원 봉수; 道圓烽燧) used for signaling during the Joseon period is located on the summit.

== Gallery ==
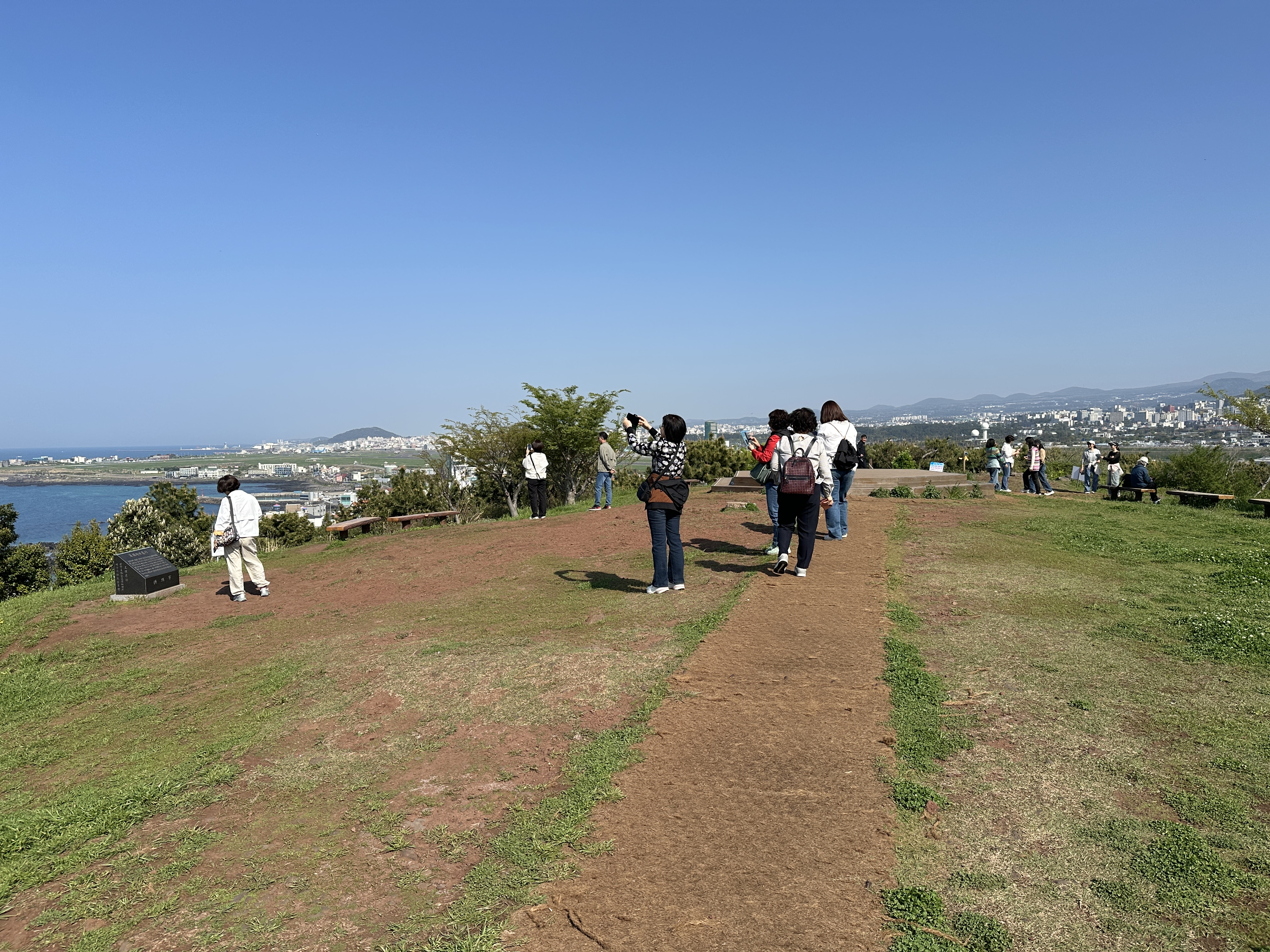
The summit (2026)

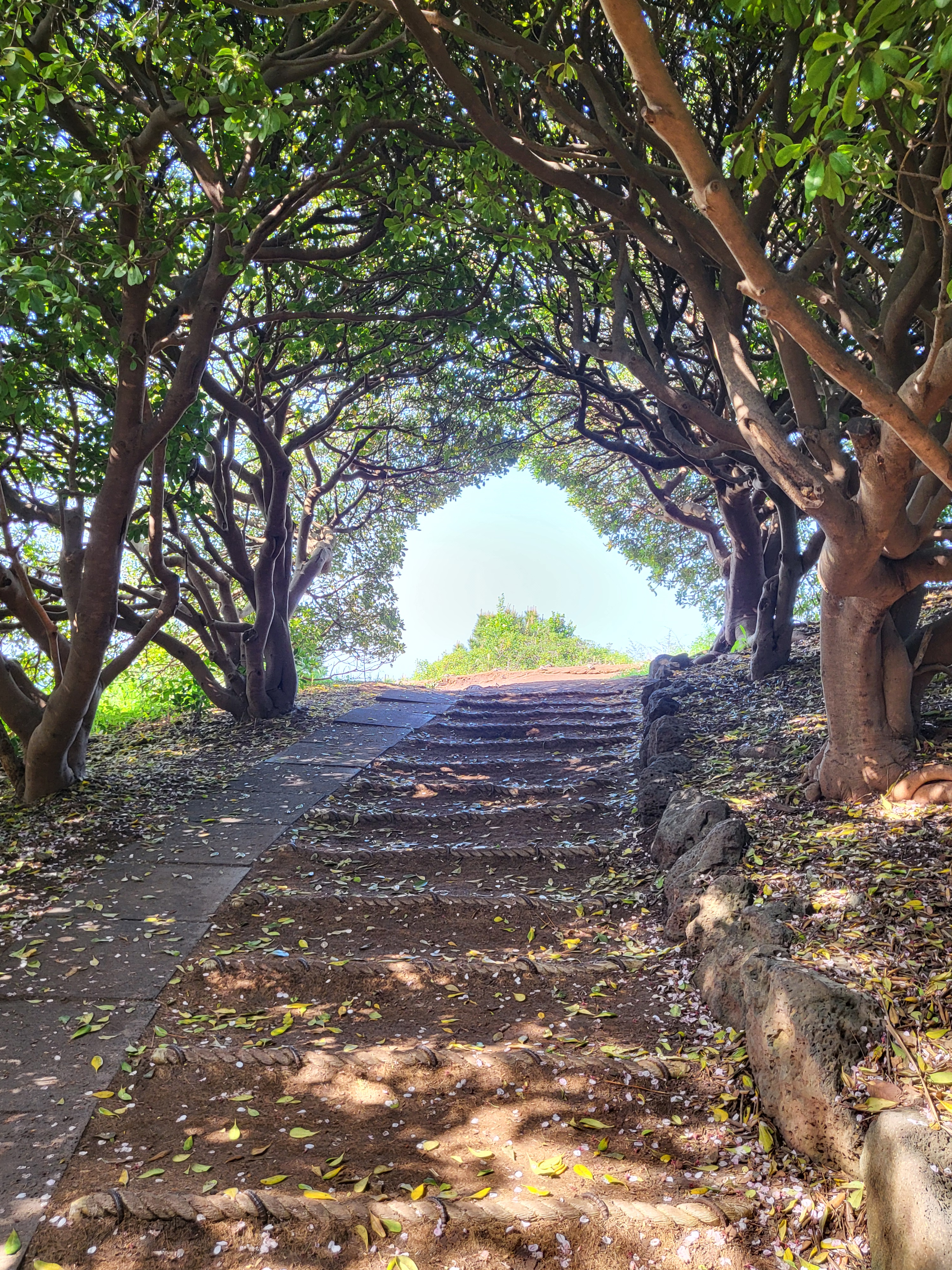
A wooded trail on the hill (2026)

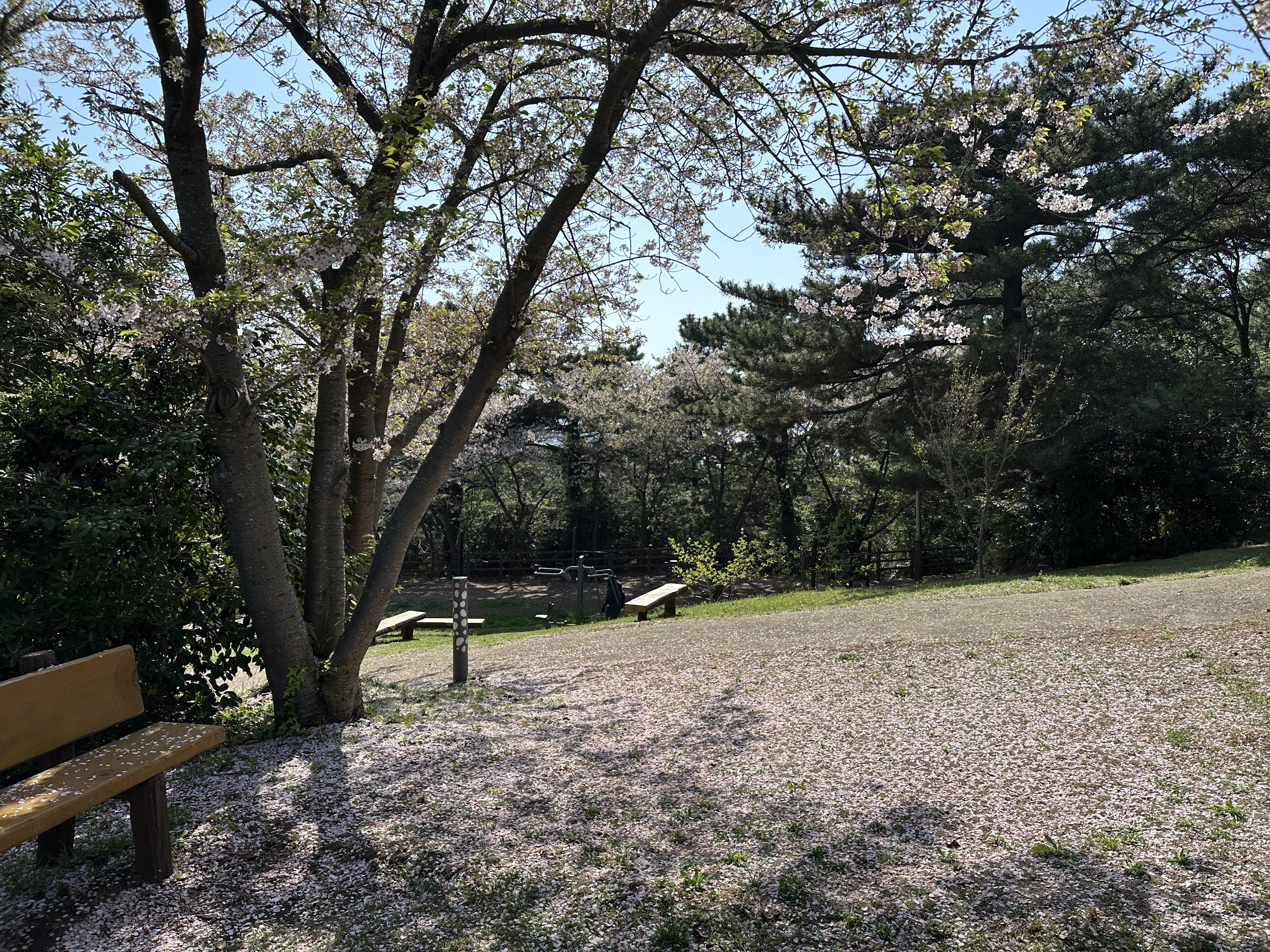
Cherry blossom trees and recreational equipment (2026)
