= Gasi Oreum =

Hill in Jeju Province, South Korea

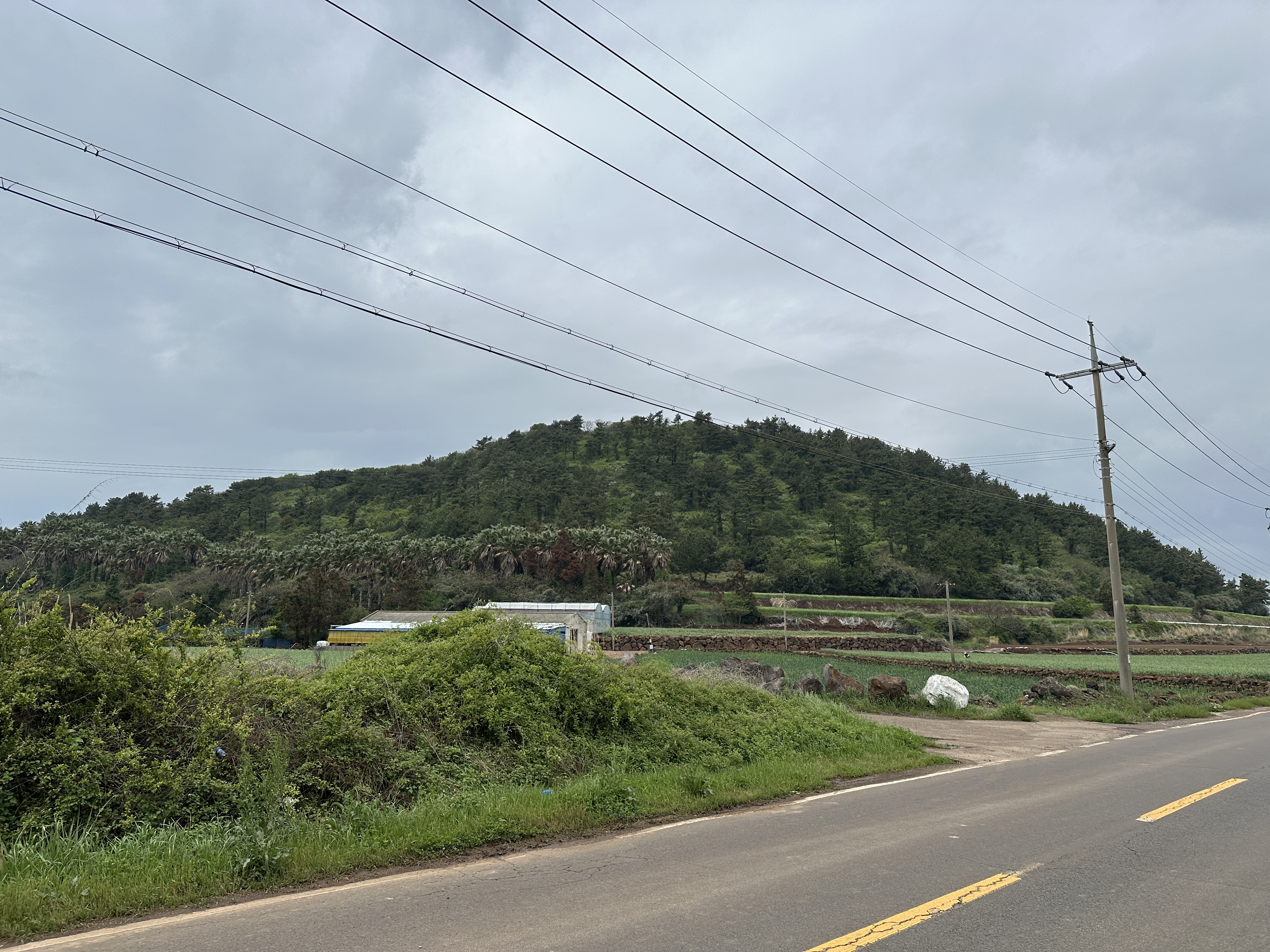
- View from base (2026)

Highest point
- Coordinates: 33.2468°N 126.2436°E

Geography

Korean name
- Hangul: 가시오름
- RR: Gasioreum
- MR: Kasiorŭm

Gasi Oreum (Korean: 가시오름) is an oreum (small extinct volcano) in Daejeong-eup, Seogwipo, Jeju Province, South Korea. It has an elevation of 106.5m, height of 77m, circumference of 1,874m, and area of 263,863m^{2}.

The mountain goes by a variety of names, including Gasireum (가시름), Gasiak (가시악; 加時岳), and Ipak (입악; 笠岳). The term gasi in the hill's name, means thorn, and refers to the numerous thorny plants that grow on the hill.

The hill has a hiking trail on it. It has been described by several writers as a fairly easy hike, in part owing to the hill's small height and size.
