= Wondangbong =

Hill in Jeju Province, South Korea

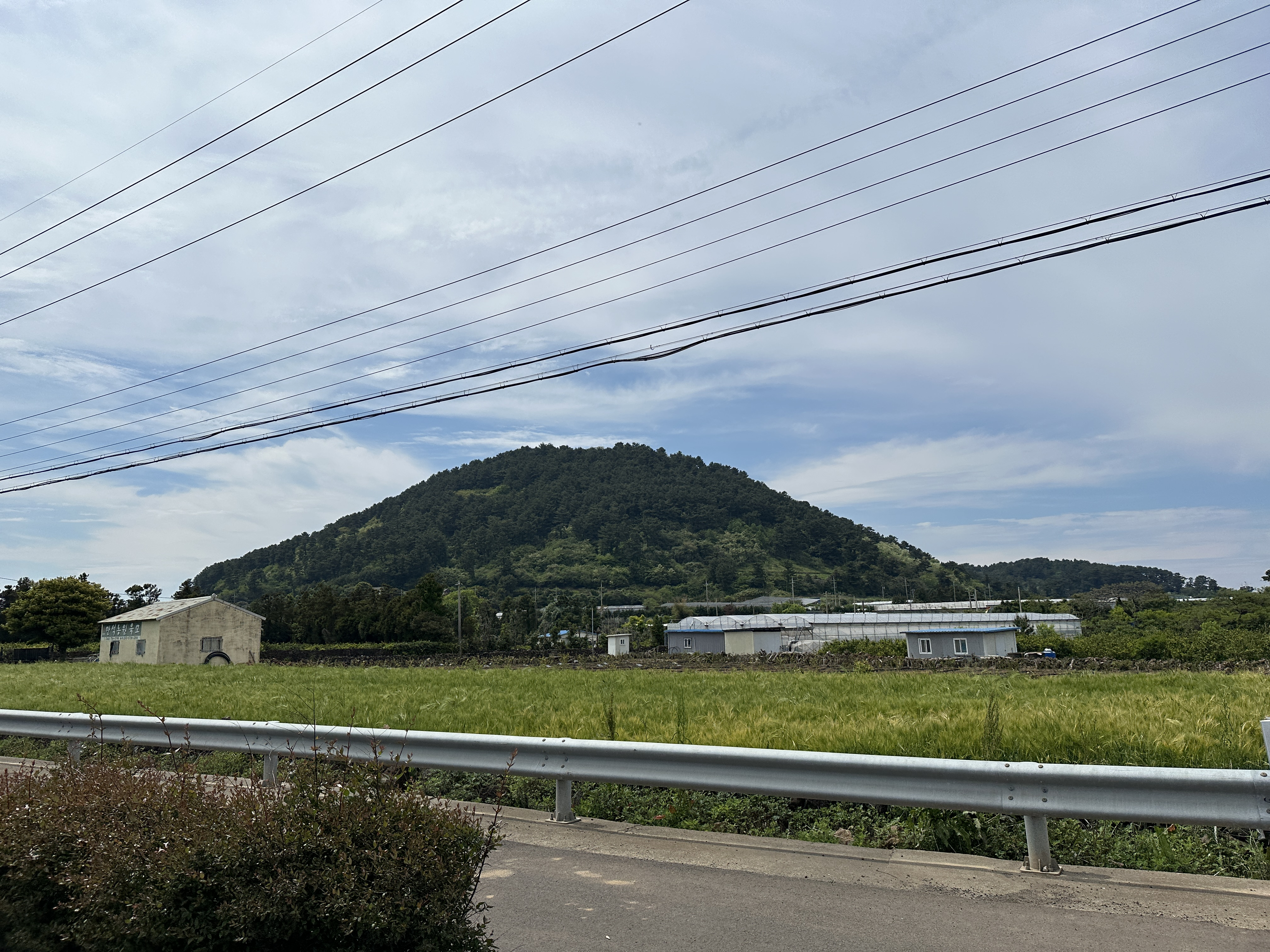
- Wondangbong, viewed from the south (2026)

Highest point
- Coordinates: 33.5254°N 126.5988°E

Geography

Korean name
- Hangul: 원당봉
- Hanja: 元堂峯
- RR: Wondangbong
- MR: Wŏndangbong

Wondangbong (Korean: 원당봉) is an oreum (small extinct volcano) in Samyang-dong, Jeju City, Jeju Province, South Korea. Its height is 120m and elevation 170.7m.

It has gone by various names, including Wendang Oreum (웬당오름), Samyang Oreum (삼양오름), Mang Oreum (망오름), Samyangbong (삼양봉), Samcheop Chilbong (삼첩 칠봉), and Wondang Chilbong (원당 칠봉). The Won in the various names refers to a temple called Wondang (원당) that once existed at the base of this oreum during the Yuan dynasty of China. The Chilbong in the various names means "seven peaks", and refers to the peaks of the hill.

The peaks of the hill are called Mang Oreum (망오름), Dosan Oreum (도산오름), Ap Oreum (앞오름), Penan Oreum (펜안오름), and Nabugi (나부기). There are several temples located around the mountain, including Bultapsa (불탑사), Wondangsa (원당사), and Mungangsa (문강사).

There is a hiking trail on the oreum. Although the oreum is not directly on the Jeju Olle Trail, it is connected to it and available as a stop.
