= Eoseungsaengak =

Mountain in Jeju Province, South Korea

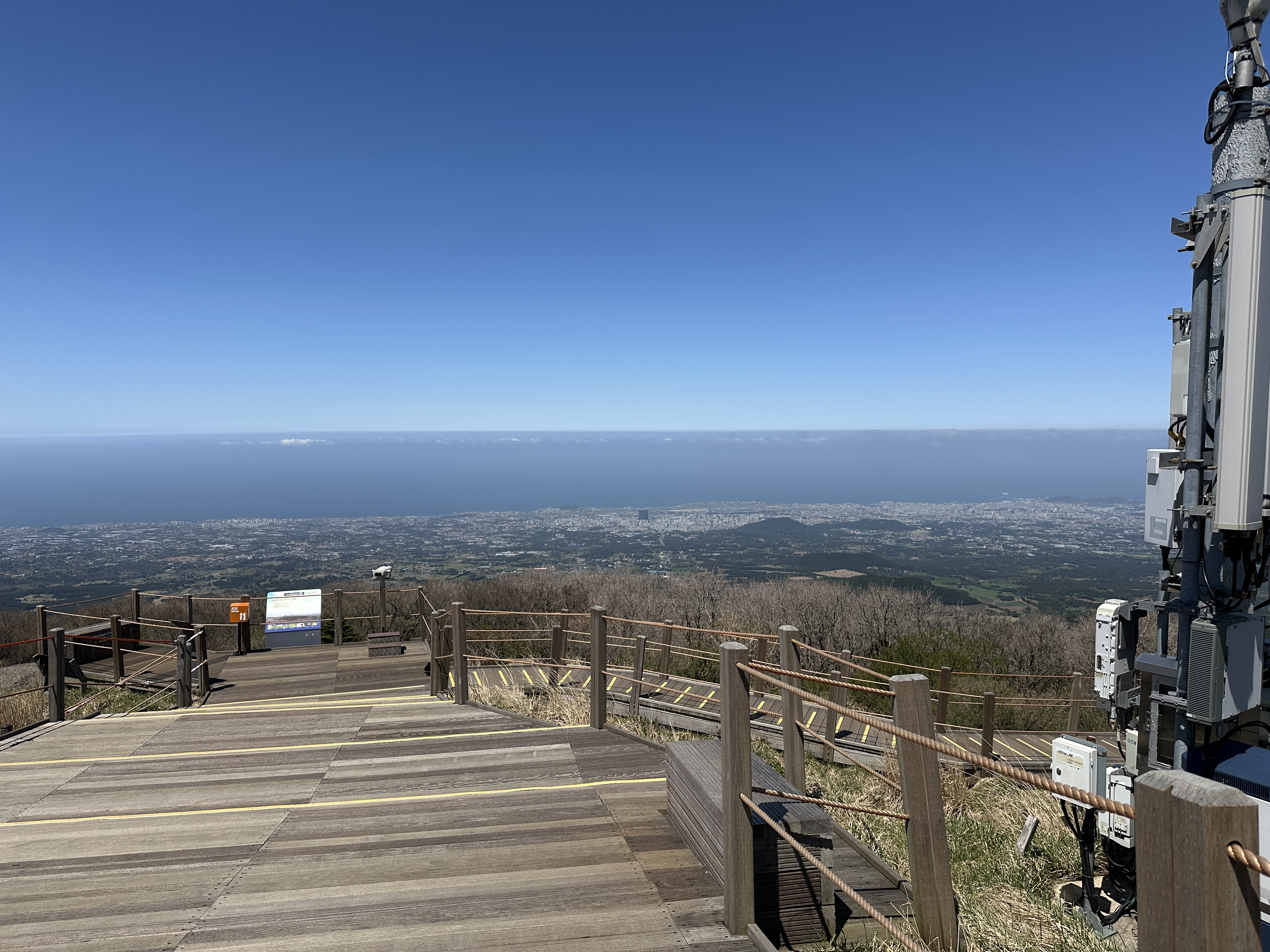
- View from the top of the mountain (2026)

Highest point
- Coordinates: 33.398°N 126.487°E

Geography

Korean name
- Hangul: 어승생악
- Hanja: 御乘生岳
- RR: Eoseungsaengak
- MR: Ŏsŭngsaengak

Alternate name
- Hangul: 어승생오름
- Hanja: 御乘生오름
- RR: Eoseungsaengoreum
- MR: Ŏsŭngsaengorŭm

Eoseungsaengak (Korean: 어승생악), also called Eoseungsaeng Oreum (어승생오름) or Eoseungsaengoreum, is an oreum (small extinct volcano) in Jeju City, Jeju Province, South Korea.

== Names ==
The oreum has gone by a variety of names, including Eoseungsaengak, Eoseungsaeng Oreum, Eoseungswingi Oreum (어스슁이오름), Eoseusingi Oreum (어스싱이오름), Eoseungak (어승악), and Eoseungbong (어승봉). In the historical text T'amnaji, it is recorded that the name "Eoseungsaeng" refers to how a mount (horse) of a king was born near here.

The mountain is nicknamed "Little Hallasan" (작은 한라산), as it is close to the larger mountain Hallasan and offers similar views.

== Description ==
The mountain has a height of 350 meters (elevation of 1,169 meters above sea level), a diameter of 1,968 meters, and area of 2.54 km^{2}. It is located in Hallasan National Park, on the north slopes of the larger mountain Hallasan.

During wet seasons, a small volcanic crater lake forms in the caldera at the top. The mountain is covered with forests. Also at the top are underground Japanese colonial era fortifications that were meant for use during the Pacific War (although that war never reached Jeju). In total, the fortification tunnels have a length of 460 meters.

== Hiking ==
The mountain is popular for hiking and has a hiking trail that has a length of 1.3 km. It takes about 30 minutes to climb it, from the parking lot trailhead to the summit. One writer for Jeju Environment News described the trail as well-maintained, accessible for most of the year, and steep but brief. The reviewer praised the view from the top.

Various events related to hiking the mountain have been held.

== Gallery ==
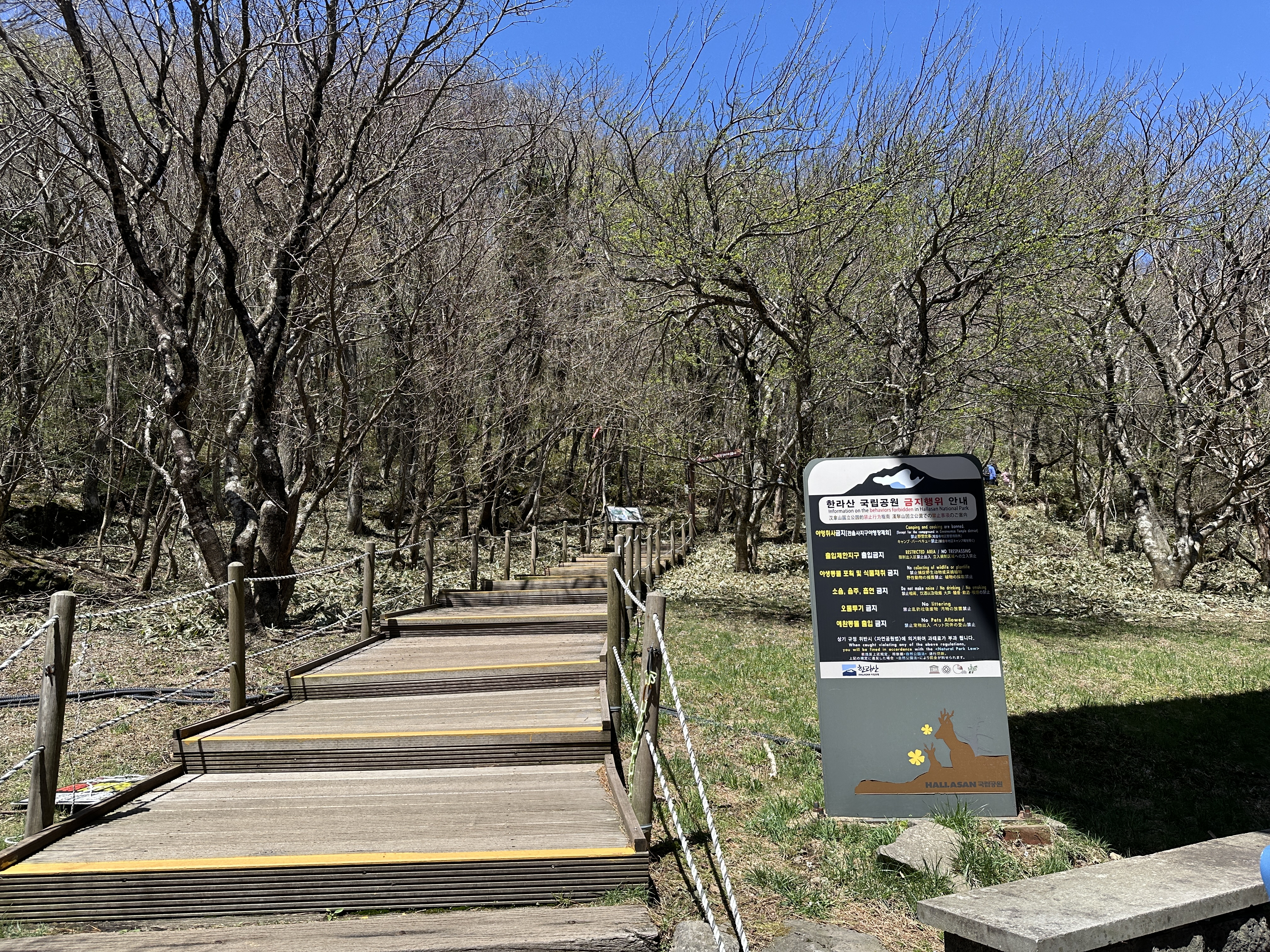
Entrance to the trail from the parking lot (2026)

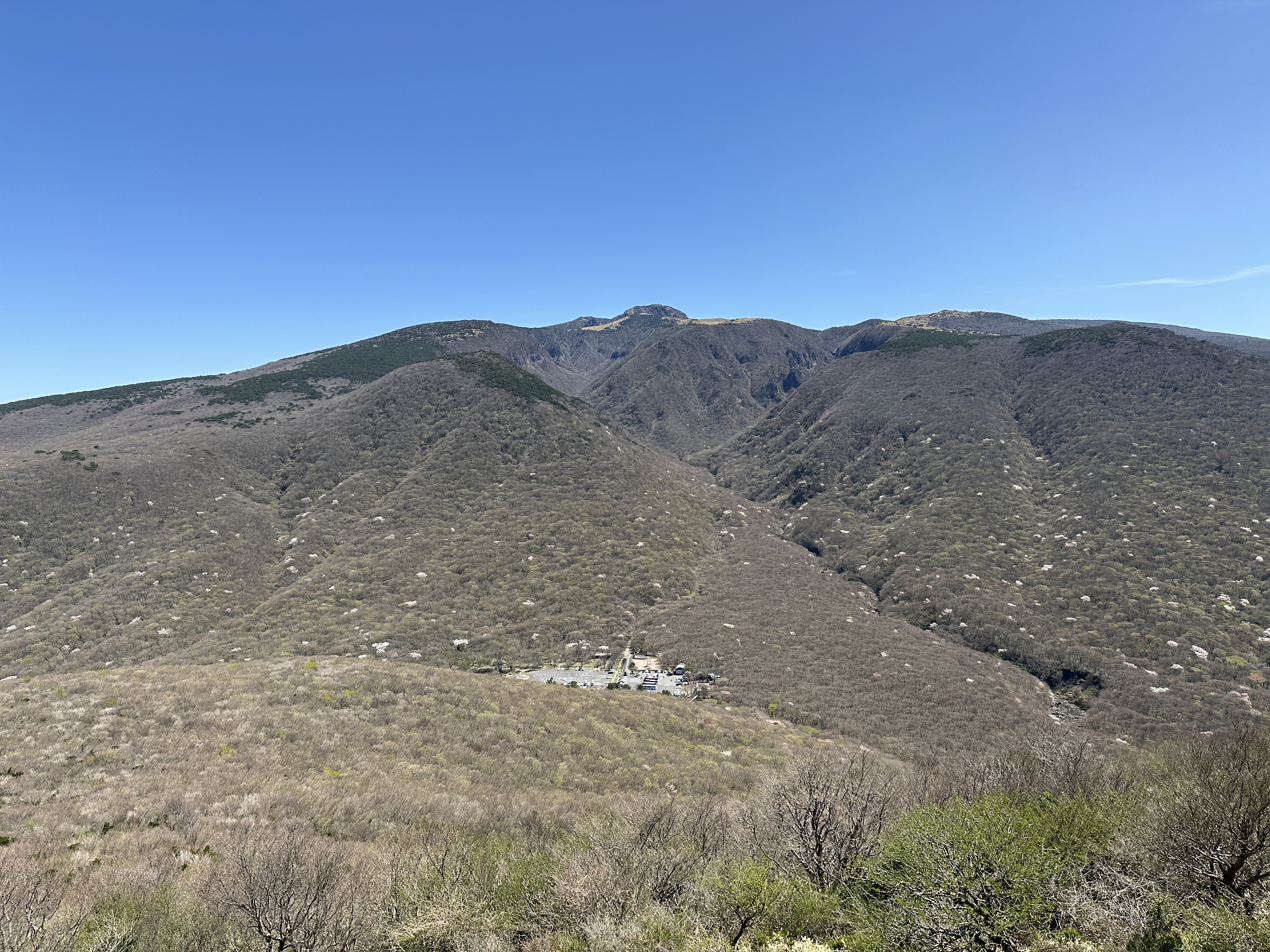
View from the top of the mountain, facing east (to Hallasan) (2026)

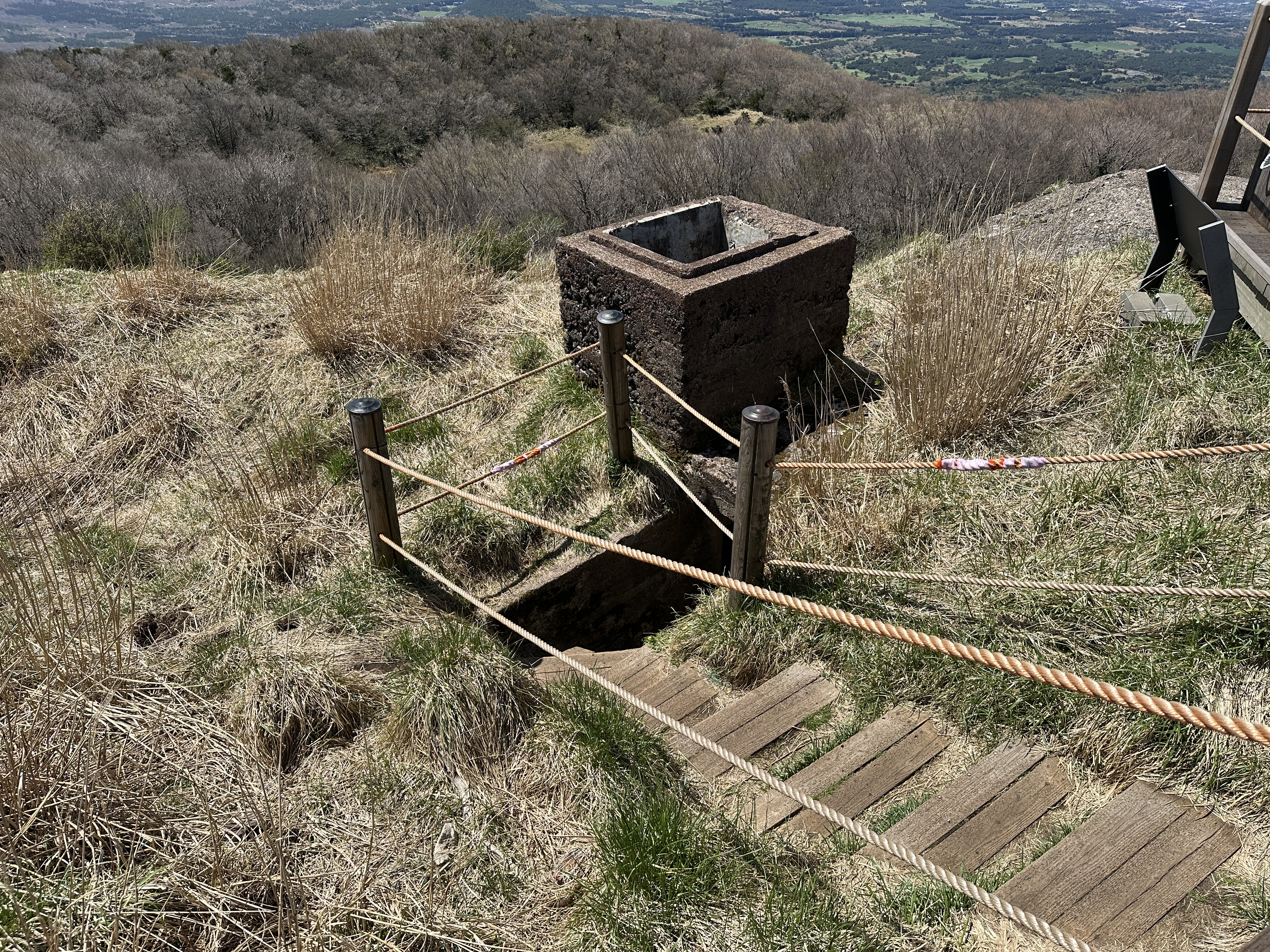
Entrance to one of the colonial-era bunkers at the top of the mountain (2026)
