= Neujiri Oreum =

Hill in Jeju Province, South Korea

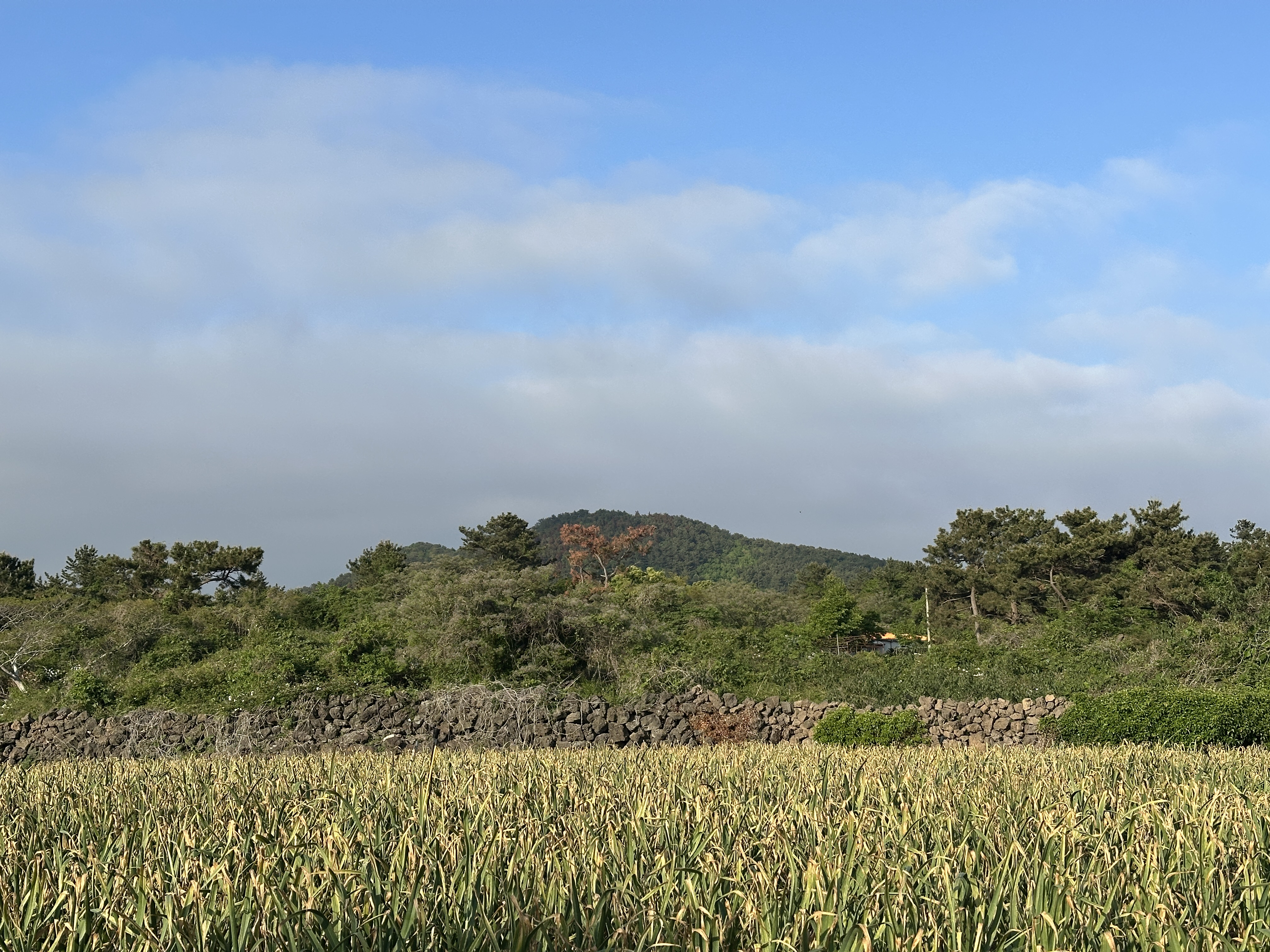
- View from the base (2026)

Highest point
- Coordinates: 33.3665°N 126.2615°E

Geography

Korean name
- Hangul: 느지리오름
- RR: Neujiri oreum
- MR: Nŭjiri orŭm

Neujiri Oreum (Korean: 느지리) is an oreum (small extinct volcano) in Sangmyeong-ri, Hallim, Jeju City, Jeju Province, South Korea. It has a height of 225m.

The oreum is named for an old name for Sangmyeong-ri; that settlement was once called "Neuji-ri". There is a hiking trail on the hill that is popular with locals. One reporter described the hike as fairly easy, with a beautiful view of the local area.

== Gallery ==
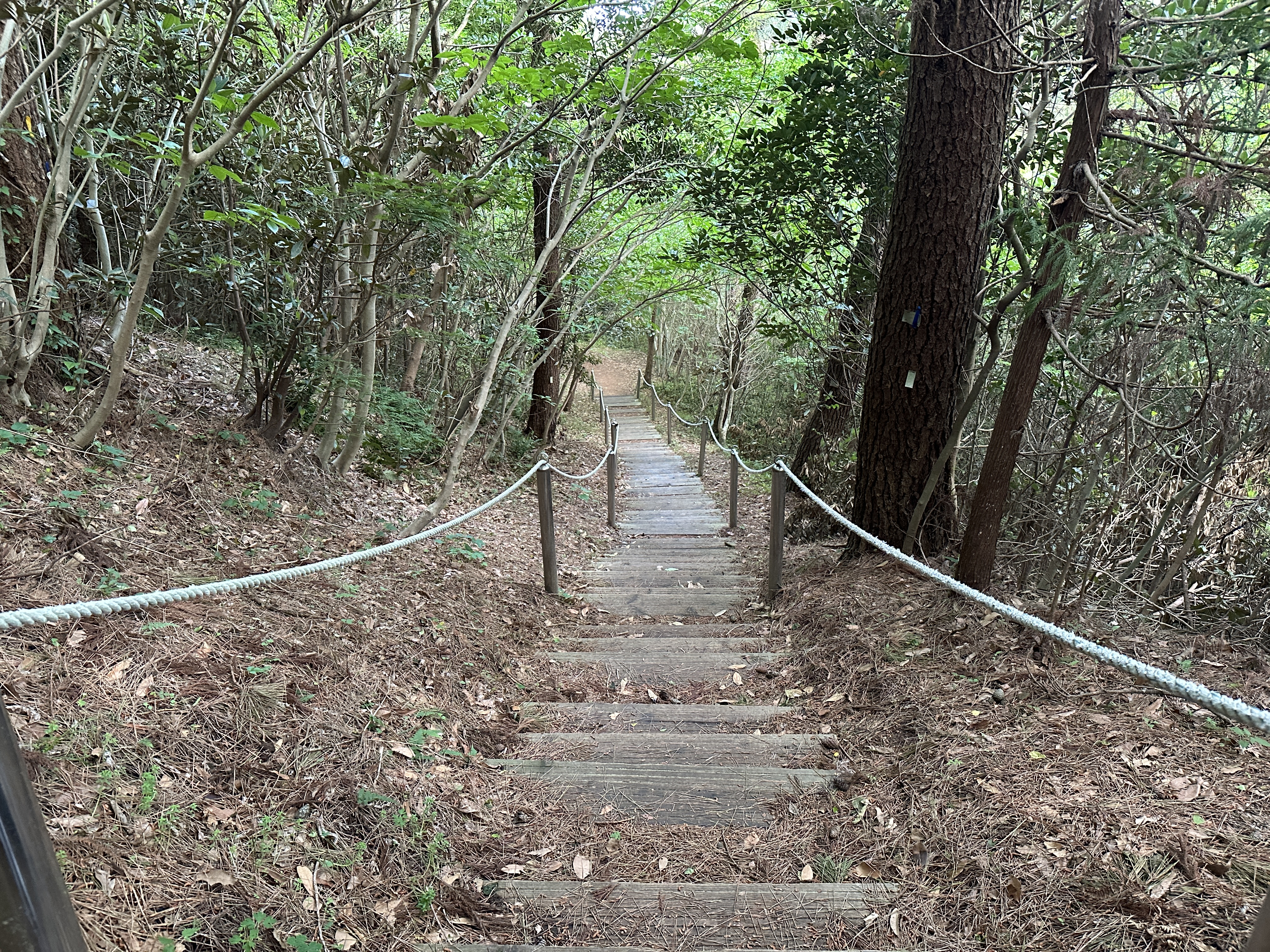
Path up the mountain (2026)

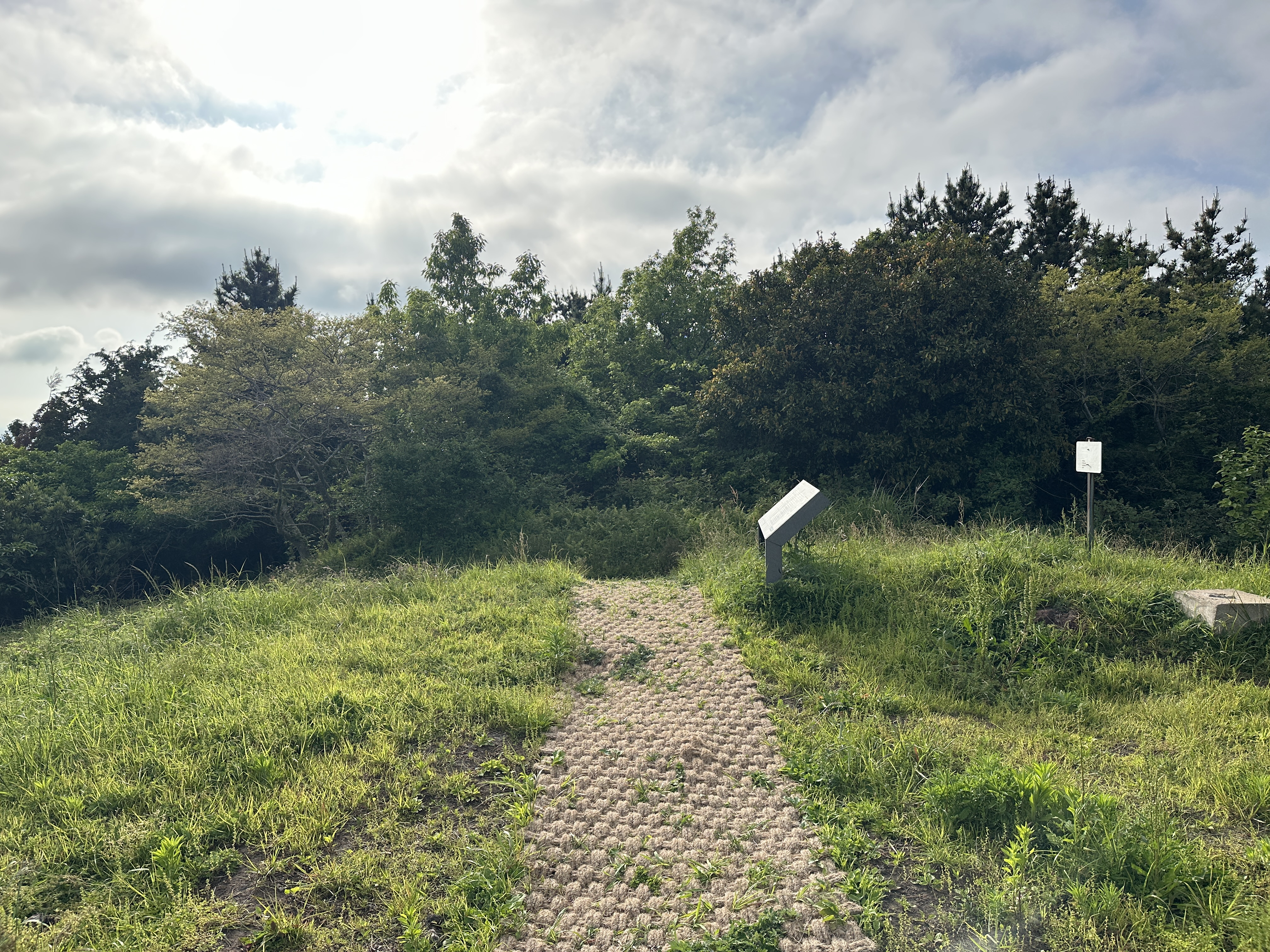
Summit (2026)
