= Wollabong =

Hill in Jeju Province, South Korea

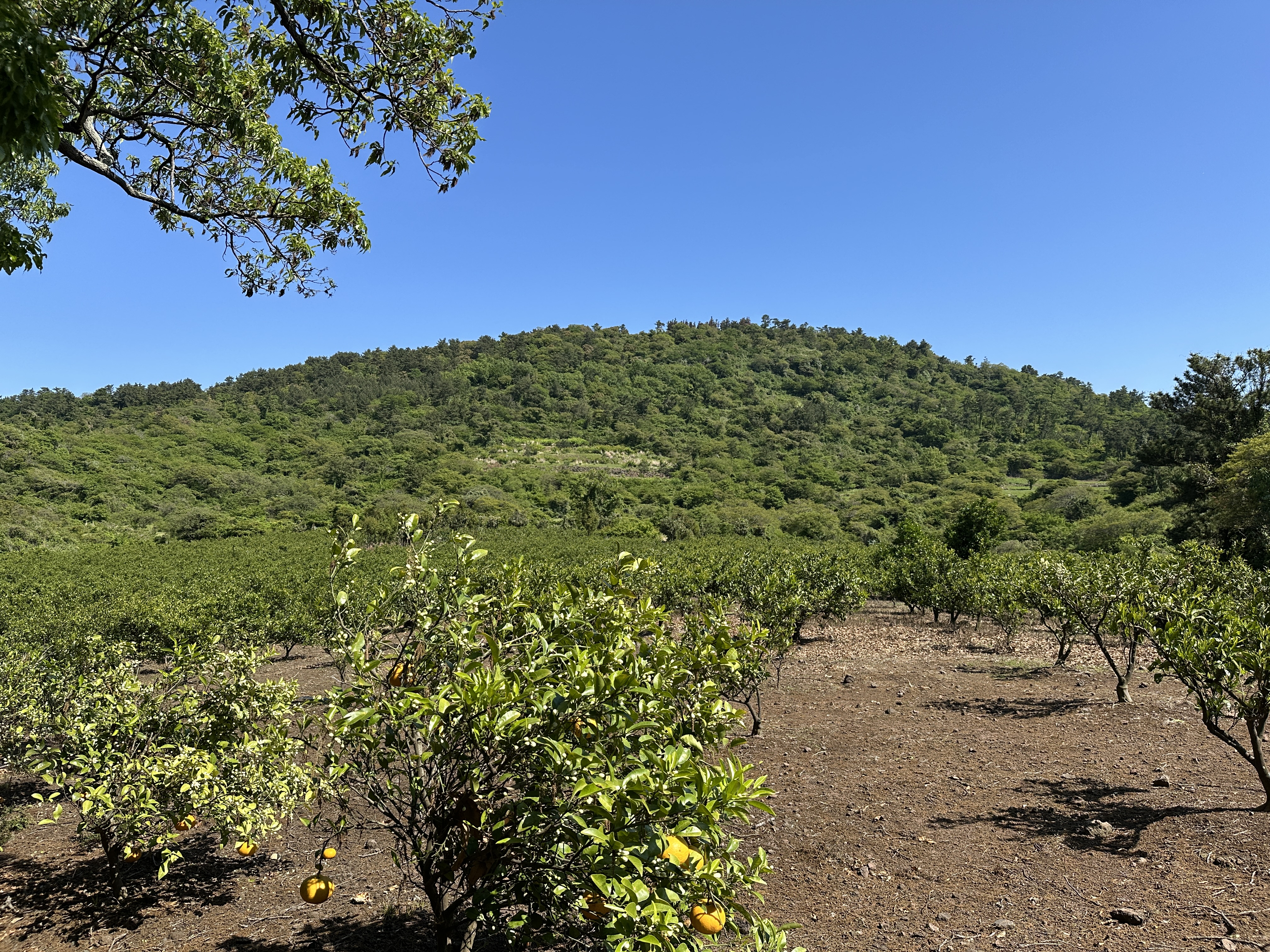
- View of the oreum from the northwest (2026)

Highest point
- Coordinates: 33.2433°N 126.3497°E

Geography

Korean name
- Hangul: 월라봉
- Hanja: 月羅峰
- RR: Wollabong
- MR: Wŏllabong

Wollabong (Korean: 월라봉) is an oreum (small extinct volcano) in Andeok-myeon, Seogwipo, Jeju Province, South Korea. It is 201 m tall and is popular for hiking.

It is possibly one of the earliest volcanoes to have formed in Jeju. The oreum is located near the major mountain Sanbangsan, and considered to have a scenic view of it from its peak.

The oreum is one of many in Jeju to have tunnels dug during the Japanese colonial period using Korean forced labor. Such tunnels were intended for military purposes, in the event of an Allied invasion of Korea.
