= Idal Oreum =

Hill in Jeju Province, South Korea

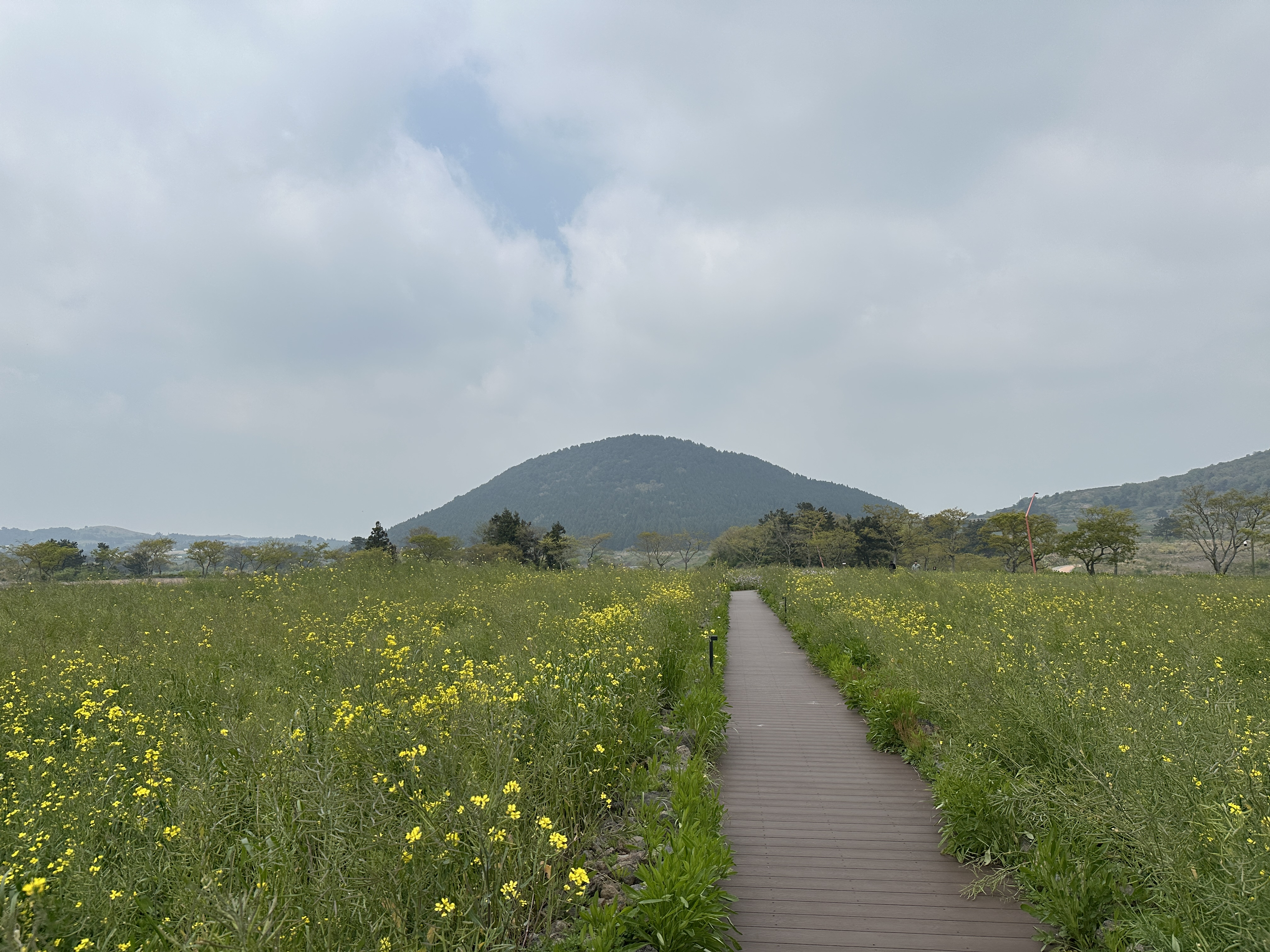
- View from a distance (2026)

Highest point
- Coordinates: 33.3641°N 126.3485°E

Geography

Korean name
- Hangul: 이달오름
- Hanja: 二達오름
- RR: Idaroreum
- MR: Idarorŭm

Alternate name
- Hangul: 이달봉
- Hanja: 二達峰
- RR: Idalbong
- MR: Idalbong

Idal Oreum (Korean: 이달오름), also called Idalbong (이달봉), is an oreum (small extinct volcano) in Jeju City, Jeju Province, South Korea. It has an elevation of 488.7m, height of 119m, and area of 2,015m^{2}. The mountain is named after the fact that it has two peaks. The mountain has a hiking trail on it.
