= Saebyeol Oreum =

Mountain in Jeju City, South Korea

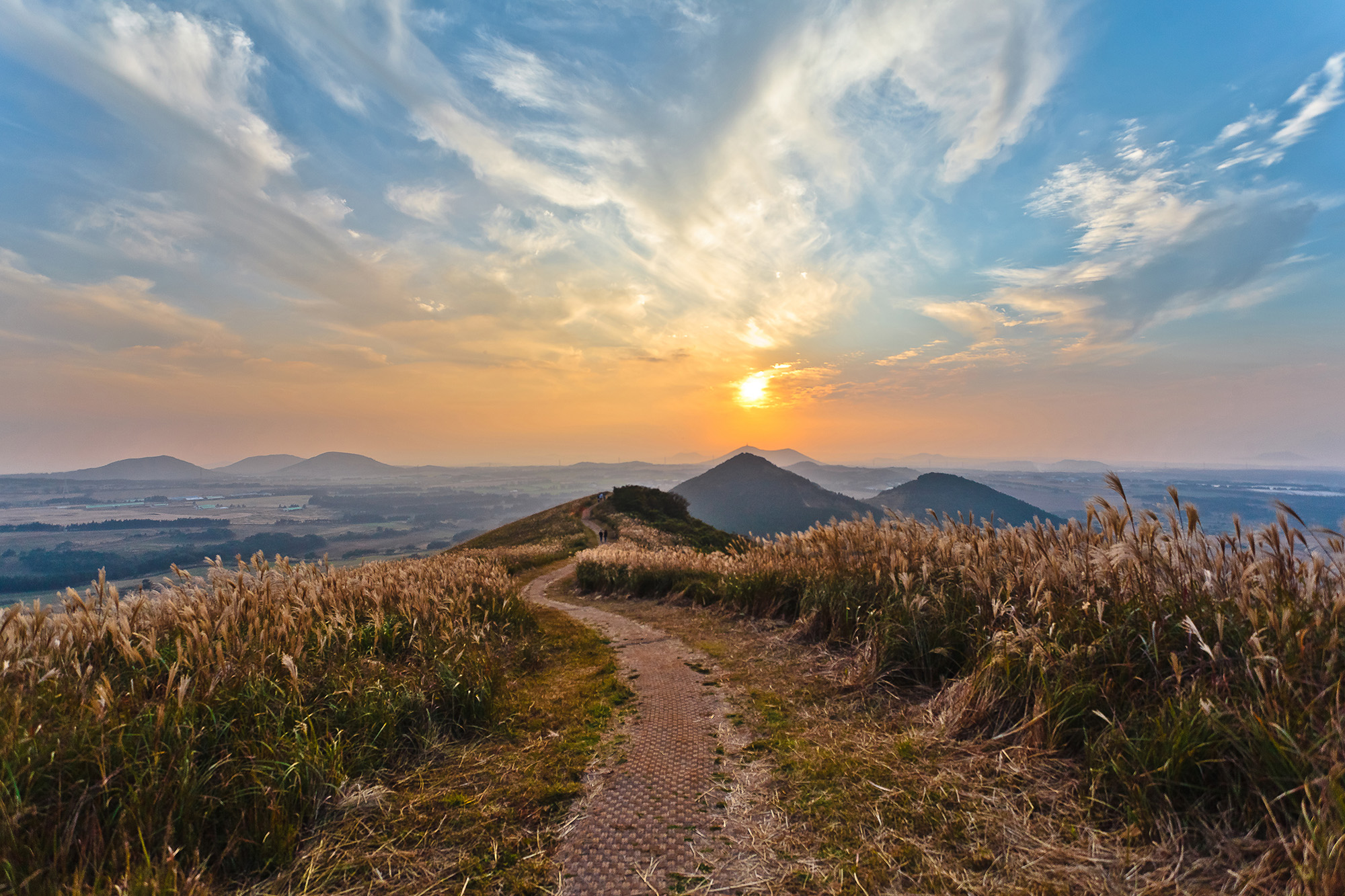
- View from the top of the oreum (2016)

Highest point
- Elevation: 519.3 m (1,704 ft)
- Coordinates: 33.365°N 126.356°E

Dimensions
- Area: 0.522 km^{2} (0.202 mi^{2})

Naming
- Etymology: Dawn star

Geography
- Location: Aewol, Jeju City, Jeju Province, South Korea

Saebyeol Oreum (Korean: 새별오름; Hanja: 曉星岳; 新星岳) is an oreum (small extinct volcano) in Aewol, Jeju City, South Korea. It has an area of 0.522 km^{2} (0.202 mi^{2}), circumference of 2,713 m (8,901 ft), and height of 519.3 m (1,704 ft).

The oreum's name means "dawn star". It is said to stand high in the sky like a star.

The oreum is reportedly one of the most popular oreums to visit, and has views of the surrounding area. Hiking up takes around 30 minutes.

== Jeju Fire Festival ==
Since 2000, the oreum has been the site of the annual Jeju Fire Festival. The festival was started in 1997. The festival is a reenactment of a traditional Jeju cultural event called bangae, during which large fires are ceremonially lit in order to pray for good fortune, burn off old grass, and kill vermin in the fields. Such burnings were held at various oreums and fields in Jeju until the 1970s, when it was banned. The festival was started as a limited cultural practice for tourism in 1997.

The festival was held virtually in 2021, during the COVID-19 pandemic. Beginning in 2025, the festival was planned to be reorganized in order to deemphasize the use of fire over environmental concerns.

== Gallery ==
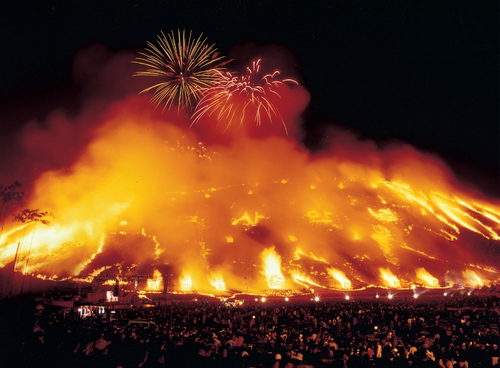
Jeju Fire Festival (2016)

== See also ==
- Oreum#List of oreum
- Geum Oreum
- Gama Oreum
