= Oreum =

Extinct volcanoes on Jeju Island, South Korea

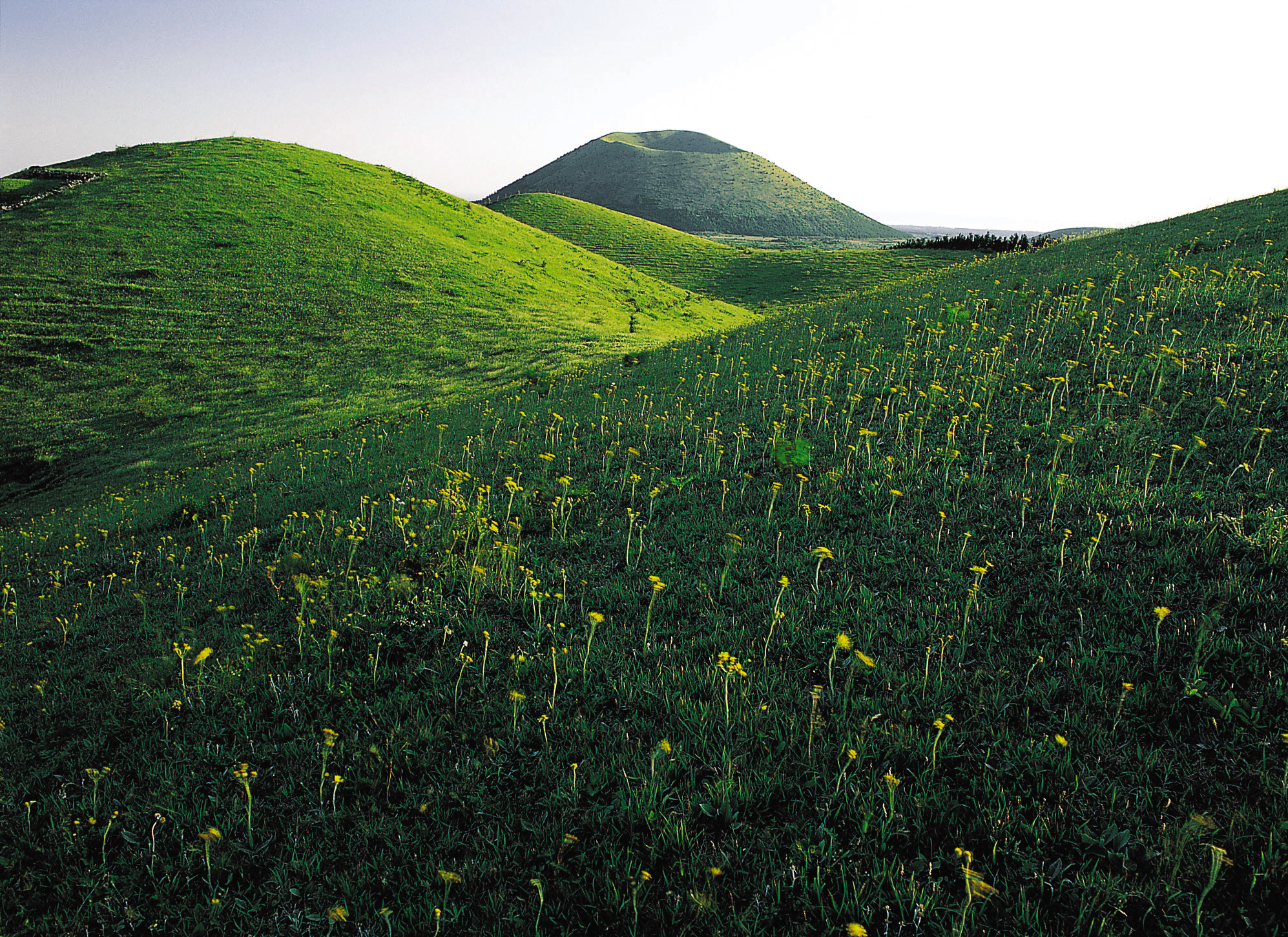
- Examples of oreum

Korean name
- Hangul: 오름
- RR: oreum
- MR: orŭm

Oreum (Korean: 오름) refers to the around 360 small rising extinct volcanoes on Jeju Island, in Jeju Province, South Korea. They are commonly described as cinder cones or parasitic cones, and are often inside larger volcanic craters.

== Etymology ==
The word oreum comes from the Jeju language. It refers to small mountains. "Oreum" itself originates from the word "climb" (오르다). The word is now considered to refer to Jeju's numerous small parasitic cones (측화산; 側火山; also 기생화산; 寄生火山).

== Description ==
Around 360 oreum are distributed throughout Jeju. Their formation and preservation are due in part to the high permeability of the volcanic rock.

Magma erupting under pressure can solidify into scoria, which may fall and pile up around a crater to form circular and elliptical scoria cones and cinder cones. These are popularly known as oreum in Jeju Island. There are about 360 such oreum. Oreum are classified as cinder cones, lava domes, fault blocks, or cryptodomes.

Oreum are considered culturally and symbolically important to Jeju. They have traditionally been associated with folk religion and ancestral worship rituals. Oreum also serve as sites of settlements (particularly at their bases), agriculture, and defense.

== Famous oreum ==
=== Geomunoreum ===
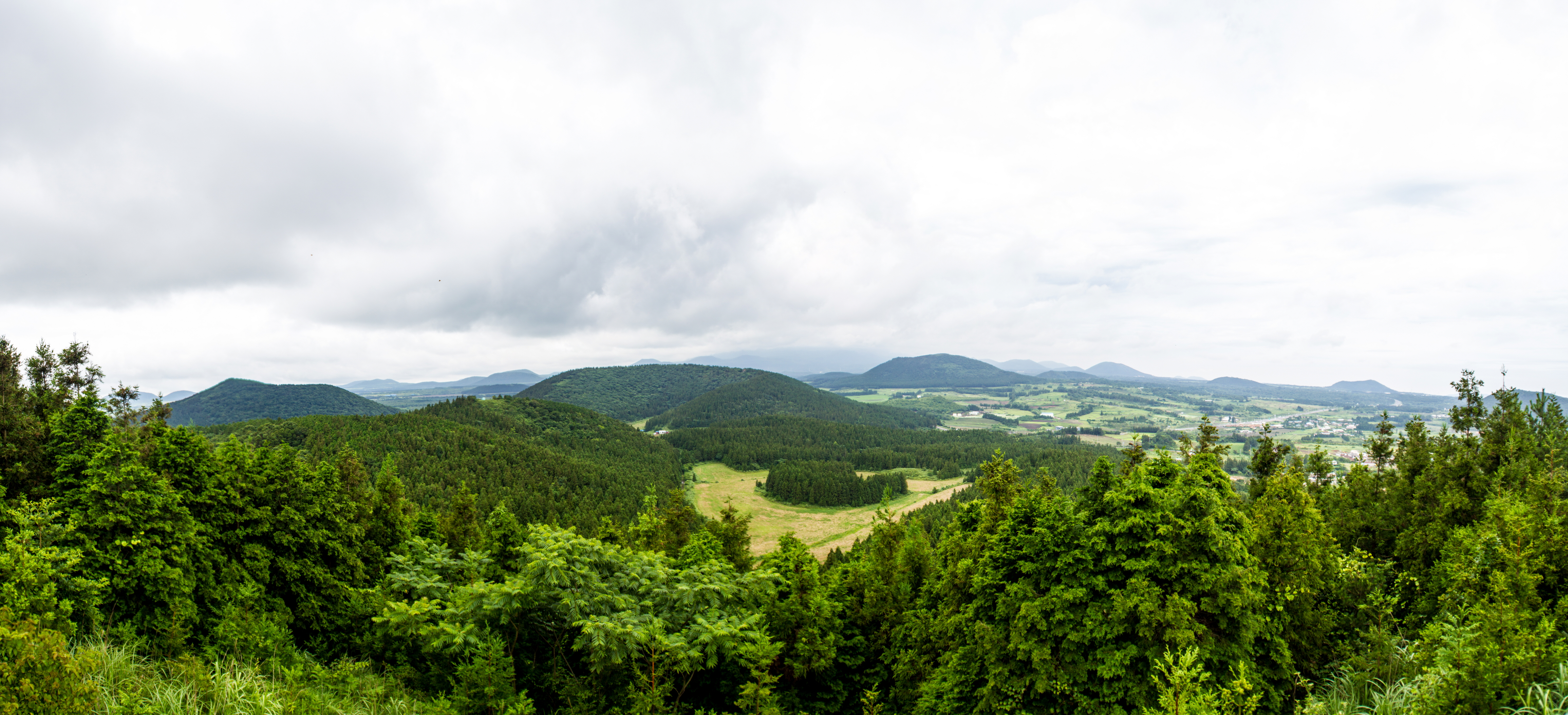
Geomunoreum

Geomunoreum is located between Jeju City and Seogwipo, on the eastern side of the island. This oreum is considered geologically interesting because of its significant lava tube system. In June 2007, this system was made a UNESCO World Natural Heritage Site, as part of the item Jeju Volcanic Island and Lava Tubes, because of its high academic and natural heritage value. Tourists are able to enter some of the lava tube system, as well as hike on a trail on the oreum.

=== Yongnuni Oreum ===
Yongnuni Oreum is 247.8 m (813 ft) tall oreum in Gujwa, Jeju City. It is likely named for, and is said to resemble a Chinese dragon lying down. The oreum is considered beautiful, with scenic views of the east coast of Jeju, including of the mountain Seongsan Ilchulbong and the island Udo. Its gentle incline makes it a popular hiking destination for families.

=== Geum Oreum ===
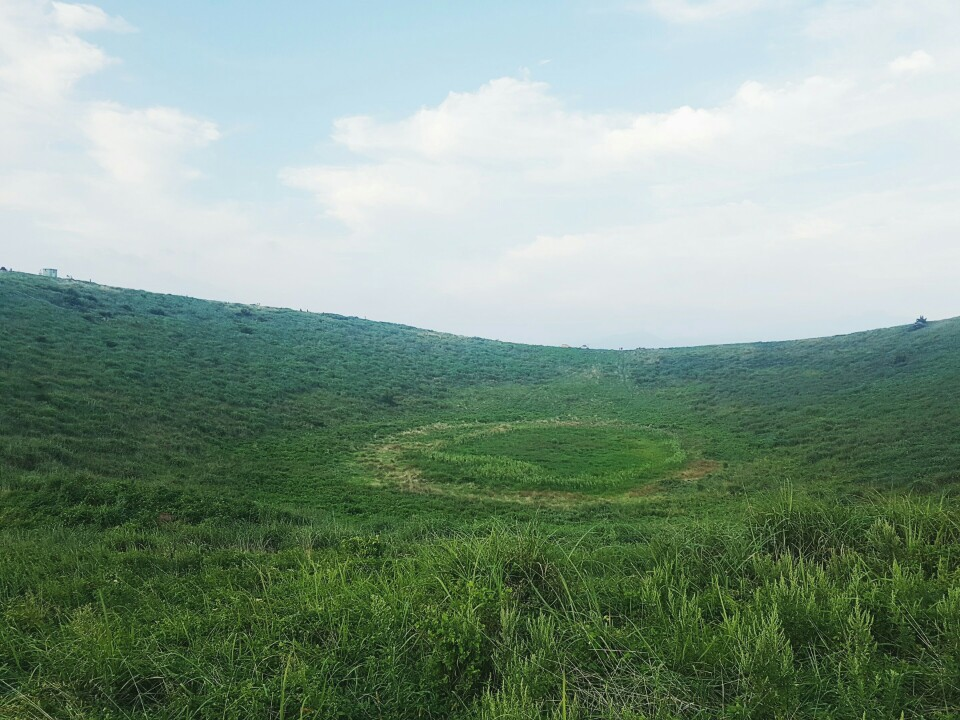
Geum Oreum

Geum Oreum, alternatively Geomeun Oreum, is located in Hallim, Jeju City. It is 427 m (1,401 ft) above sea level at its highest point. It is on privately owned land, and offers views of Hallasan and Sanbangsan, as well as paragliding from the top. People can hike up to the top, where there is a marshy area inside a caldera.

=== Saebyeol Oreum ===
Saebyeol Oreum is located in Bongseong-ri, Aewol-eup, Jeju. Saebyeol Oreum was also called the Saebel Oreum or Saebil Oreum. It was written as Hyobyeolak (曉別岳) in the geography book Sinjeungdonggukyeojiseungram, Hyoseongak (曉星岳) in the text T'amnajidomitchidobyŏngsŏ and Sinseongak (新星岳) in the text Chejuguynŭpchi (제주군읍지). There is a view that Saebel and Saebil are words in the Jeju language meaning "stars" but this is uncertain. At the southern peak, there are ridges in the southwest, northwest, and northeast directions and there are 5 dagger-shaped mountaintops that look like a star. And Saebyeol Oreum was the place where Goryeo [Korean) military under General Choi Young suppressed the Mongolian military.

=== Darangswi Oreum ===
Darangswi Oreum is located in Sehwa-ri, Gujwa-eup, Jeju. Although it is only 382 meters above sea level, it has all of the characteristics of a volcanic terrain and is called a 'queen of oreum. Darangswi (다랑쉬) is the dialect of Jeju which means the Moon. It is named Darangswi because the crater of mountain peaks looks like a full moon. There is a large, deep funnel-shaped circular crater in the mountain area. The outer circumference of this crater is about 1,500 m. It forms a long ellipse from south to north, the north is relatively flat. The depth of the crater is 115 m, which is the same as Baengrokdam on Hallasan. Most oreum are asymmetrically inclined, whereas Darangswi Oreum is arranged with concentric contour lines. There is a village of Darangswi, which was abandoned due to the Jeju Uprising. In 1992, eleven of the remains of the victims were unearthed at the Darangswi cave.

=== Ttarabi Oreum ===
Ttarabi Oreum is located in Gasi-ri, Pyoseon-myeon, Seogwipo. One of the biggest features there is 3 craters. Several large and small peaks are connected with a smooth ridge. On the horseshoe-shaped foot of the mountain, there are debris slide layers as Dunji Oreum in Gujwa-eup. It is said that it is considered to belong to a recent volcano erupted because of the debris slide. It is said that the name, Ttarabi (따라비) comes from the name Ttangharabeoji (땅할아버지), which looks like a family with nearby oreum. Ttangharabeoji means grandfather for ground in English. Ttarabi Oreum is a typical autumn oreum. As well as the foot of the oreum, the surrounding mountain is a silver grass field. Back then, horses were released and raised in the great grassland.

== Statistics ==
=== By region ===
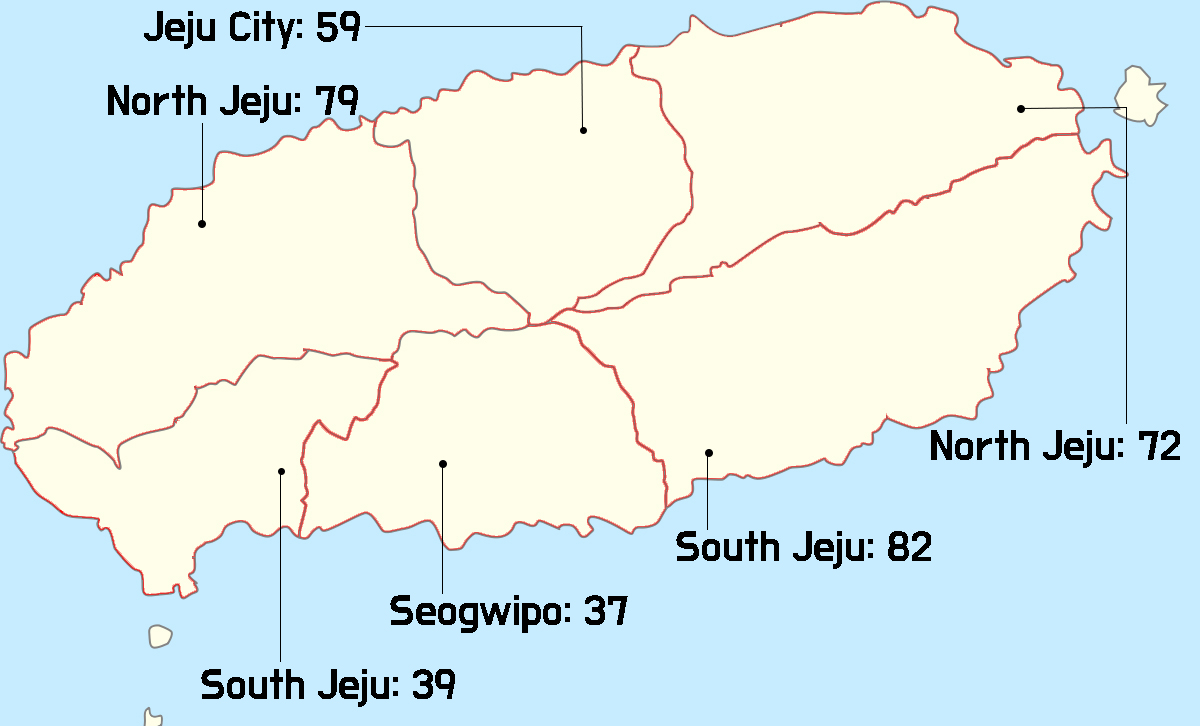

- Jeju City (제주시) : 59
- Seogwipo (서귀포시) : 37
- North part of Jeju (북제주군) : 151 (Hallim-eup 16, Aewol-eup 50, Gujwa-eup 40, Jocheon-eup 30, Hangyeong-myeon 13, Udo-myeon 2)
- South part of Jeju (남제주군) : 121 (Daejeong-eup 8, Namwon-eup 29, Seongsan-eup 22, Andeok-myeon 31, Pyoseon-myeon 31)

=== By type ===
Classification by type
Classification	Sum	Horseshoe-type	Cone-type	Circle-type	Hybrid-type
Sum	368	174	102	53	39
Jeju City	59	29	21	6	3
Seogwipo	37	8	20	6	3
Hallim-eup	16	9	2	2	3
Aewol-eup	50	25	17	2	6
Gujwa-eup	40	26	1	7	6
Jocheon-eup	30	17	2	7	4
Hangyeong-myeon	13	5	2	3	3
Udo-myeon	2	-	1	-	1
Daejeong-eup	8	3	3	1	1
Namwon-eup	29	12	11	6	-
Seongsan-eup	22	9	6	5	2
Andeok-myeon	31	13	10	3	5
Pyoseon-myeon	31	18	6	5	2

== List of oreum ==
This is a list of oreum on Jeju. There are reportedly 368 oreum, of which 63% are privately owned.

=== Jeju City ===
This is a list of 51 oreum in Jeju City (제주시)

- Gasatgi Oreum (가삿기오름; also 가새기오름, 가삭봉)
- Gaeori Oreum (개오리오름; also 개월오름)
- Geochin Oreum (거친오름; also 거친악, 거체악)
- Geolsi Oreum (걸시오름; also 걸세오름)
- Geomeun Oreum (검은오름; also 금오름, 검오름)
- Golmeori Oreum (골머리오름; also 골머리)
- Gwangi Oreum (광이오름; also 괭이오름)
- Gwonje Oreum (권제오름; also 권재오름, 건제오름)
- Namjiseun Oreum (남짓은오름; also 남조순오름)
- Nori Oreum (노리오름; also 노리손이, 노루생이)
- Nun Oreum (눈오름; also 누운오름)
- Neunghwa Oreum (능화오름; also 능하오름)
- Dodubong (도두봉; also 도들오름, 도원봉)
- Dol Oreum (돌오름; also 신산오름, 신선오름, 숫오름)
- Deulle Oreum (들레오름)
- Deulli Oreum (들리오름; also 두루머를)
- Muljangori (물장오리; also 물장올)
- Min Oreum (민오름; also 뒷민오름, 무녜오름)
- Min Oreum (민오름; also 족은민오름)
- Balgeun Oreum (밝은오름)
- Batsemi (밧세미; also 밭생이)
- Bangilbong (방일봉; also 방일이동산)
- Beduri Oreum (베두리오름)
- Beri Oreum (베리오름; also 별도봉)
- Bonggae Oreum (봉개오름; also 봉아오름, 봉아름)
- Bulkandi Oreum (불칸디오름)
- Sara Oreum (사라오름; also 사라봉)
- Samgakbong (삼각봉)
- Sangyeo Oreum (상여오름)
- Seongjini Oreum (성진이오름; also 개오름)
- Semi Oreum (세미오름; also 삼의양오름)
- Sosan Oreum (소산오름)
- Ssalson Oreum (쌀손오름; also 쌀손장오리)
- Ansemi (안세미; also 명도오름, 조리세미오름, 형제봉)
- Al Oreum (알오름)
- Eoseungsaeng Oreum (어승생오름; also 어승생, 어스승이)
- Yeoranji Oreum (열안지오름; also 연난지, 여난지)
- Odeusing Oreum (오드싱오름; also 오두싱이)
- Wanggwalleung (왕관릉; also 왕관바위, 연딧돌)
- Wondangbong (원당봉; also 원당오름, 웬당오름)
- Janggumok (장구목)
- Jeolmul Oreum (절물오름; also 큰대나)
- Jogeundeure (족은드레; also 족은두레왓)
- Jinmulgumburi (진물굼부리; also 진머리)
- Chik Oreum (칡오름; also 칠오름)
- Keunnorisoni (큰노리손이; also 노리오름)
- Keundeure (큰드레; also 큰두레왓)
- Teyeokjangori (테역장오리; also 테역장올)
- Heukbulgeun Oreum (흙붉은오름)

=== Seogwipo ===
This is a list of 31 oreum in Seogwipo (서귀포시)

- Gaksibau Oreum (각시바우오름; also 각시바위, 각수바위)
- Gaetgeori Oreum (갯거리오름; also 갯그르)
- Georin Oreum (거린오름; also 거린사슴, 거린사슴오름)
- Gogeunsan (고근산; also 고공산)
- Gusanbong (구산봉; also 개오름)
- Gungsan (궁산; also 활오름)
- Nokhajiak (녹하지악; also 녹하지오름)
- Darae Oreum (다래오름; also 도래오름)
- Deode Oreum (더데오름; also 더디오름, 더더오름)
- Mangbat (망밭)
- Moraiak (모라이악; also 모라지, 모라봉, 냇새오름)
- Miaksan (미악산; also 솔오름, 쌀오름)
- Bangae Oreum (방애오름; also 방에오름, 침악)
- Beopjeongak (법정악; also 법정이오름)
- Berinnae Oreum (베릿내오름)
- Boromi (보롬이)
- Bolle Oreum (볼레오름; also 볼래오름, 존자오름)
- Sammaebong (삼매봉; also 세미양오름)
- Seol Oreum (설오름; also 서리오름)
- Si Oreum (시오름; also 수컷오름, 숫오름)
- Eojeomi Oreum (어점이오름; also 어점이악)
- Yeongcheon Oreum (영천오름; also 영천악, 영세미오름)
- Obaekjanggun (오백장군; also 오백나한, 천불암)
- Ubo Oreum (우보오름; also 우보악, 우보름)
- Wollasan (월라산; also 도라미, 돌라미오름)
- Wolsanbong (월산봉)
- Injeong Oreum (인정오름)
- Jejigi Oreum (제지기오름; also 절오름)
- Chik Oreum (칡오름; also 칠오름, 칙오름)
- Hanon (하논)

=== Aewol-eup ===
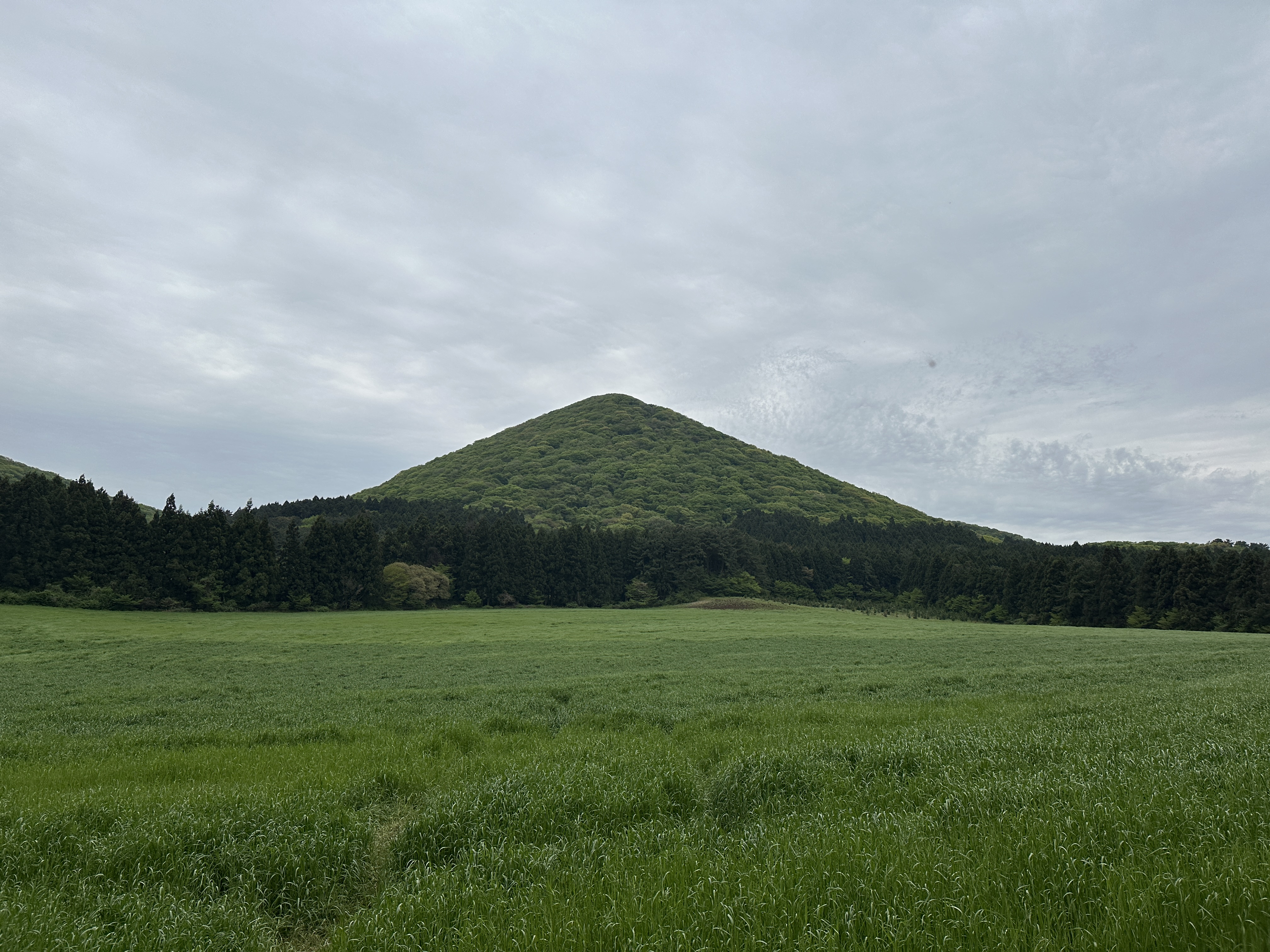
Keunnokkome Oreum (2026)

This is a list of 32 oreum in Aewol-eup (애월읍)

- Geumdeok Oreum (금덕오름; also 검은덕이, 검은데기, 검은덕오름)
- Gonae Oreum (고내오름; also 고니오름, 망오름, 고내봉)
- Gwa Oreum (과오름; also 곽오름, 큰오름, 샛오름)
- Goe Oreum (괴오름; also 괴미오름)
- Gwenmul Oreum (궷물오름)
- Geungnak Oreum (극락오름)
- Keunnokkome Oreum (큰녹고메오름; also 녹고메; 노꼬메; 큰녹고메; 성제오름)
- Nokkome (노꼬메 also 족은오름)
- Noro Oreum (노로오름)
- Nun Oreum (눈오름)
- Nuun Oreum (누운오름; also 논오름)
- Darae Oreum (다래오름)
- Mulme (물메; also 물미, 수산봉)
- Bari Oreum (발이오름; also 바리메, 큰바리메)
- Bukdorajin Oreum (북돌아진오름)
- Bulgeun Oreum (붉은오름)
- Binne Oreum (빈네오름; also 채악, 잠악)
- Sajebidongsan (사제비동산; also 새잽이오름, 사제비오름, 조접악)
- Salpin Oreum (살핀오름)
- Samhyeongje Oreum (삼형제오름; also 세오름)
- Saebyeol Oreum (새별오름; also 샛별오름)
- An Oreum (안오름)
- Eodo Oreum (어도오름; also 도노미)
- Utse Oreum (웃세오름; also 윗세오름)
- Idal Oreum (이달오름; also 이달봉)
- Iseureong Oreum (이스렁오름)
- Jogeunbarime (족은바리메)
- Cheona Oreum (천아오름; also 초낭오름)
- Chenmang Oreum (쳇망오름; also 망체오름)
- Bagumji Oreum (바굼지오름; also 파군봉)
- Pongnang Oreum (폭낭오름)
- Handae Oreum (한대오름)

=== Hallim-eup ===
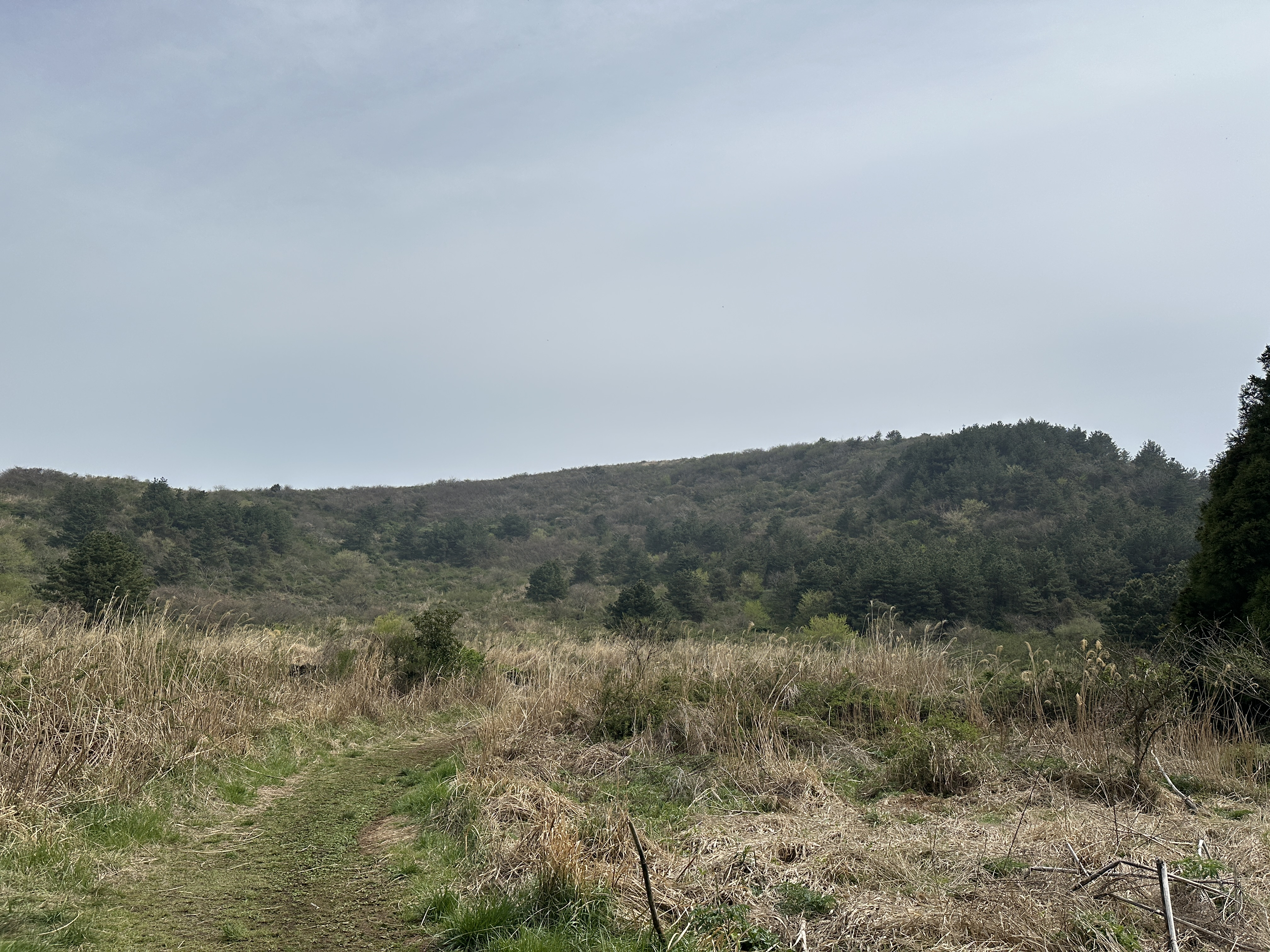
Jeongmul Oreum (2026)

This is a list of 16 oreum in Hallim-eup (한림읍)

- Gaetgeori Oreum (갯거리오름; also 갯걸오름, 개꼬리오름)
- Geum Oreum (금오름; also 검악, 검은오름)
- Nuun Oreum (누운오름; also 눈오름)
- Neujiri Oreum (느지리오름; also 망오름)
- Mundoji Oreum (문도지오름; also 문돗지)
- Beolgeun Oreum (벌근오름; also 밝은오름)
- Myeongwol Oreum (명월오름; also 밝은오름)
- Balgeun Oreum (밝은오름)
- Bangju Oreum (방주오름; also 방지오름, 방제오름)
- Biyangbong (비양봉; also 가재, 큰암메창, 족은암메창, 서산)
- Seonso Oreum (선소오름)
- Semiso Oreum (세미소오름; also 세미소)
- Jeongmural Oreum (정물알오름)
- Jeongmul Oreum (정물오름)
- Jeongwol Oreum (정월오름)
- Cheona Oreum (천아오름; also 초낭오름, 처남오름, 처나름)

=== Daejeong-eup ===
This is a list of 8 oreum in Daejeong-eup (대정읍)

- Gasi Oreum (가시오름; also 가스름)
- Nongnam Oreum (녹남오름; also 녹남봉)
- Dondumi Oreum (돈두미오름; also 돈대미, 돈도름)
- Dongal Oreum (동알오름)
- Moseulgae Oreum (모슬개오름; also 모슬봉, 모살개오름)
- Boromi (보롬이; also 보름이)
- Seodal Oreum (섯알오름; also 알봉)
- Songaksan (송악산; also 절울이)

=== Seongsan-eup ===
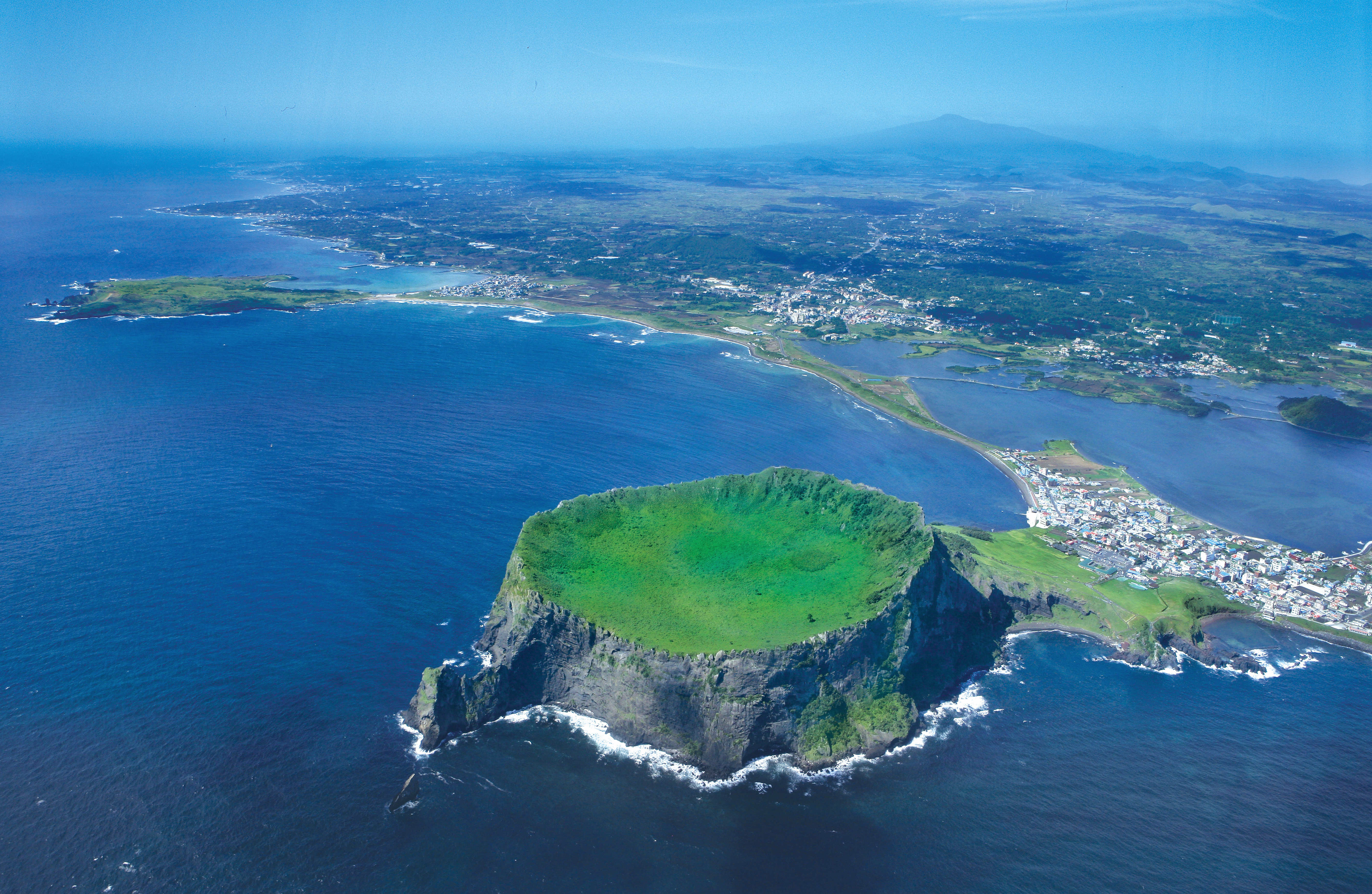
Seongsan Ilchulbong

This is a list of 18 oreum in Seongsan-eup (성산읍)

- Gungdae Oreum (궁대오름; also 궁대악)
- Nasiri Oreum (나시리오름)
- Namgot Oreum (남곶오름; also 낭곶오름, 낭끼오름, 남케오름)
- Namsanbong (남산봉; also 망오름)
- Daesusanbong (대수산봉; also 큰물뫼, 물미오름, 큰물미)
- Daewangsan (대왕산; also 왕뫼, 왕이미, 왕이메)
- Dokjae Oreum (독재오름; also 독자봉, 오름삿기)
- Dolmi (돌미; also 돌리미)
- Dusanbong (두산봉; also 말미오름, 멀미오름)
- Dwigubeuni (뒤굽은이; also 뒤곱은이, 뒤꾸부니)
- Moguri Oreum (모구리오름; also 모골이)
- Bonji Oreum (본지오름)
- Seongsan Ilchulbong (성산; also 일출봉)
- Sosusanbong (소수산봉; also 족은물뫼, 족은물미)
- Sowangsan (소왕산; also 족응왕뫼, 족은왕이미)
- Siksanbong (식산봉; also 바오름)
- Yugeone Oreum (유건에오름; also 유건이, 이기네)
- Tong Oreum (통오름)

=== Gujwa-eup ===
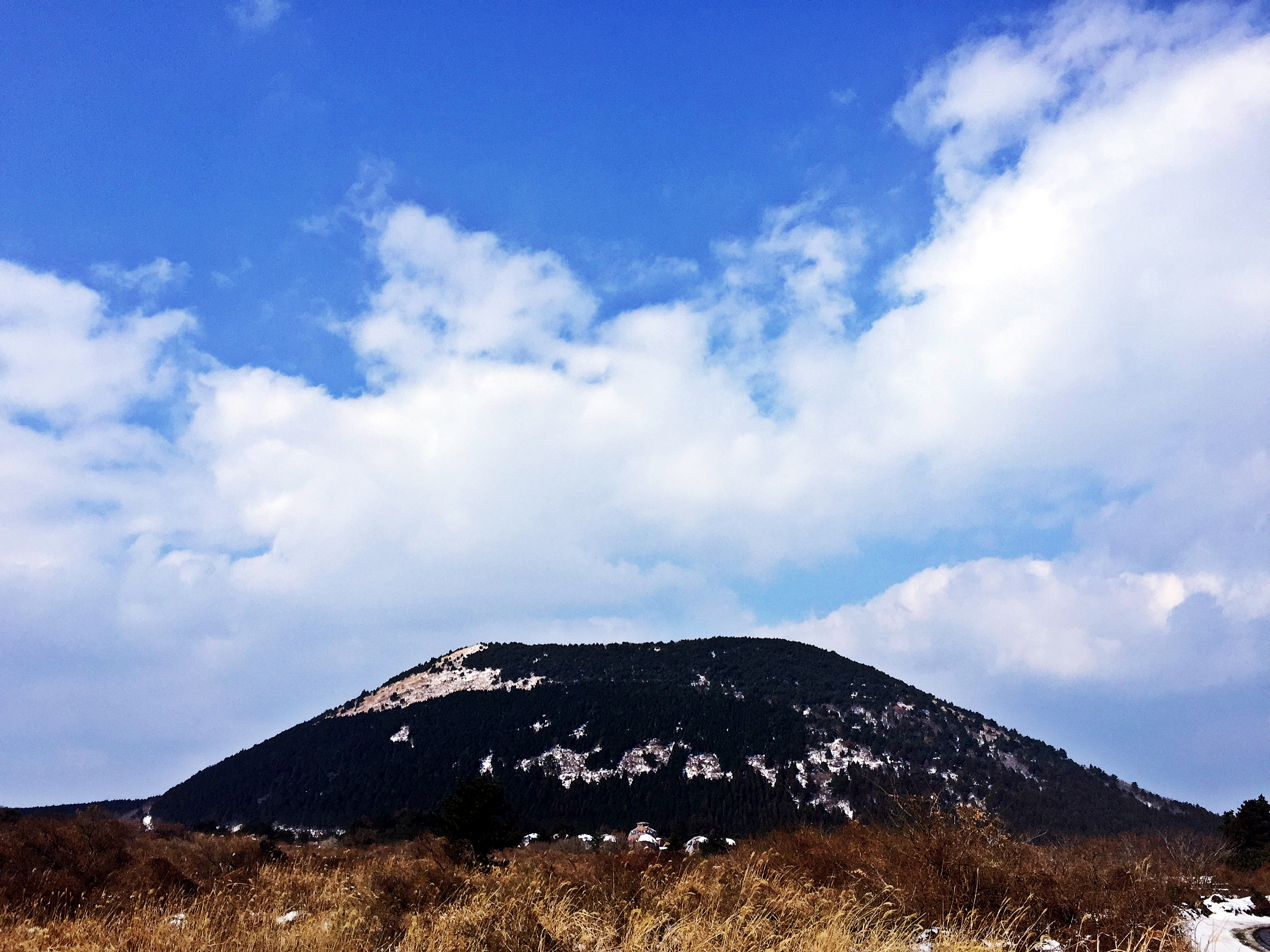
Darangswi Oreum in the winter (2016)

This is a list of 33 oreum in Gujwa-eup (구좌읍)

- Gameuni Oreum (감은이오름)
- Geoseunsaemi Oreum (거슨새미오름; also 거슨세미, 세미오름, 샘오름)
- Geochin Oreum (거친오름)
- Nopeun Oreum (높은오름)
- Darangswi Oreum (다랑쉬오름; also 달랑쉬, 도랑쉬)
- Dang Oreum (당오름)
- Donggeomeun Oreum (동검은오름; also 동검은이, 거미오름)
- Dot Oreum (돝오름; also 돛오름, 비지오름)
- Dunji Oreum (둔지오름; also 둔지봉)
- Dwigubeuni (뒤굽은이)
- Myosanbong (묘산봉; also 괴살미, 고살미, 괴살메)
- Munseogi Oreum (문석이오름)
- Min Oreum (민오름)
- Batdol Oreum (밧돌오름; also 밖돌오름, 밭돌오름)
- Buk Oreum (북오름)
- Bichimi Oreum (비치미오름; also 비찌미)
- Seonjogi Oreum (선족이오름; also 웃선족이, 알선족이)
- Seongbul Oreum (성불오름; also 성불암, 성보람)
- Sonji Oreum (손지오름; also 손자봉)
- Sigeuni Oreum (식은이오름; also 사근이오름)
- Akkeundarangswi Oreum (아끈다랑쉬오름)
- Abu Oreum (아부오름; also 앞오름, 압오름, 아보름)
- Andol Oreum (안돌오름)
- Anchin Oreum (안친오름; also 아진오름)
- Eodae Oreum (어대오름; also 어두름)
- Yongnuni Oreum (용눈이오름)
- Eunwolbong (은월봉; also 윤드리오름)
- Ipsanbong (입산봉; also 삿갓오름, 망오름)
- Juche Oreum (주체오름; also 흙붉은오름)
- Jimibong (지미봉; also 지깍오름)
- Che Oreum (체오름; also 골체오름)
- Chik Oreum (칡오름)
- Keundorimi (큰돌이미; also 도리미, 돌리미)

=== Jocheon-eup ===
This is a list of 25 oreum in Jocheon-eup (조천읍)

- Geomunoreum (거문오름; also 서검은이, 서검은오름)
- Gugeune Oreum (구그네오름; also 가시네오름)
- Salhani Oreum (살한이오름; also 궤펭이오름, 살하니오름, 궤펜이)
- Kkakkeuraegi (까끄래기; also 꼬끄래기)
- Kkoekkori Oreum (꾀꼬리오름; also 것구리오름, 앵악, 원오름)
- Neopgeori (넙거리)
- Neupseori (늡서리)
- Dang Oreum (당오름)
- Daecheoni Oreum (대천이오름)
- Dombae Oreum (돔배오름; also 돔바름)
- Malchat (말찻; also 몰찻)
- Mulchat Oreum (물찻오름)
- Min Oreum (민오름)
- Banong Oreum (바농오름; also 바늘오름, 바능오름)
- Bangae Oreum (방애오름; also 큰방애오름, 구악)
- Budaeak (부대악; also 부대오름)
- Busoak (부소악; also 부소오름, 새몰메)
- Sangumburi (산굼부리)
- Seoubong (서우봉; also 서모오름)
- Semi Oreum (세미오름; also 샘이오름)
- Albam Oreum (알밤오름; also 알바매기)
- Eohu Oreum (어후오름; also 어후름)
- Ujinjebi (우진제비; also 우전제비)
- Utbam Oreum (웃밤오름; also 웃바매기)
- Jigeuri Oreum (지그리오름; also 지기리오름)

=== Namwon-eup ===
This is a list of 23 oreum in Namwon-eup (남원읍)

- Georin Oreum (거린오름)
- Geolse Oreum (걸세오름; also 걸시오름, 걸쇠오름, 걸서악)
- Goi Oreum (고이오름; also 고리오름, 고이악)
- Gwepeni (궤펜이; also 물오름)
- Neoksi Oreum (넉시오름; also 넋이오름, 넉시악)
- Neokgeori Oreum (넉거리오름; also 넙거리)
- Nongo Oreum (논고오름; also 논고름)
- Dongsuak (동수악)
- Meoche Oreum (머체오름; also 마체오름)
- Mulyeongari Oreum (물영아리)
- Min Oreum (민오름; also 민악산)
- Bori Oreum (보리오름; also 보리악)
- Sara Oreum (사라오름)
- Saryeoni (사려니; also 사랭이오름, 소랭이오름)
- Saenggi Oreum (생기오름; also 생길이오름, 생기악)
- Seongneol Oreum (성널오름)
- Suak (수악)
- Yeojeorak (여절악; also 예절이오름, 여쩌리)
- Yechonmang (예촌망; also 망오름, 호촌봉)
- Unji Oreum (운지오름; also 운지악, 운주오름, 운주름)
- Ungak (웅악; also 쇠기오름, 숫오름, 소기오름)
- Iseungak (이승악; also 이승이오름, 이슥이오름)
- Jabae Oreum (자배오름; also 자배봉, 저바니오름)

=== Andeok-myeon ===
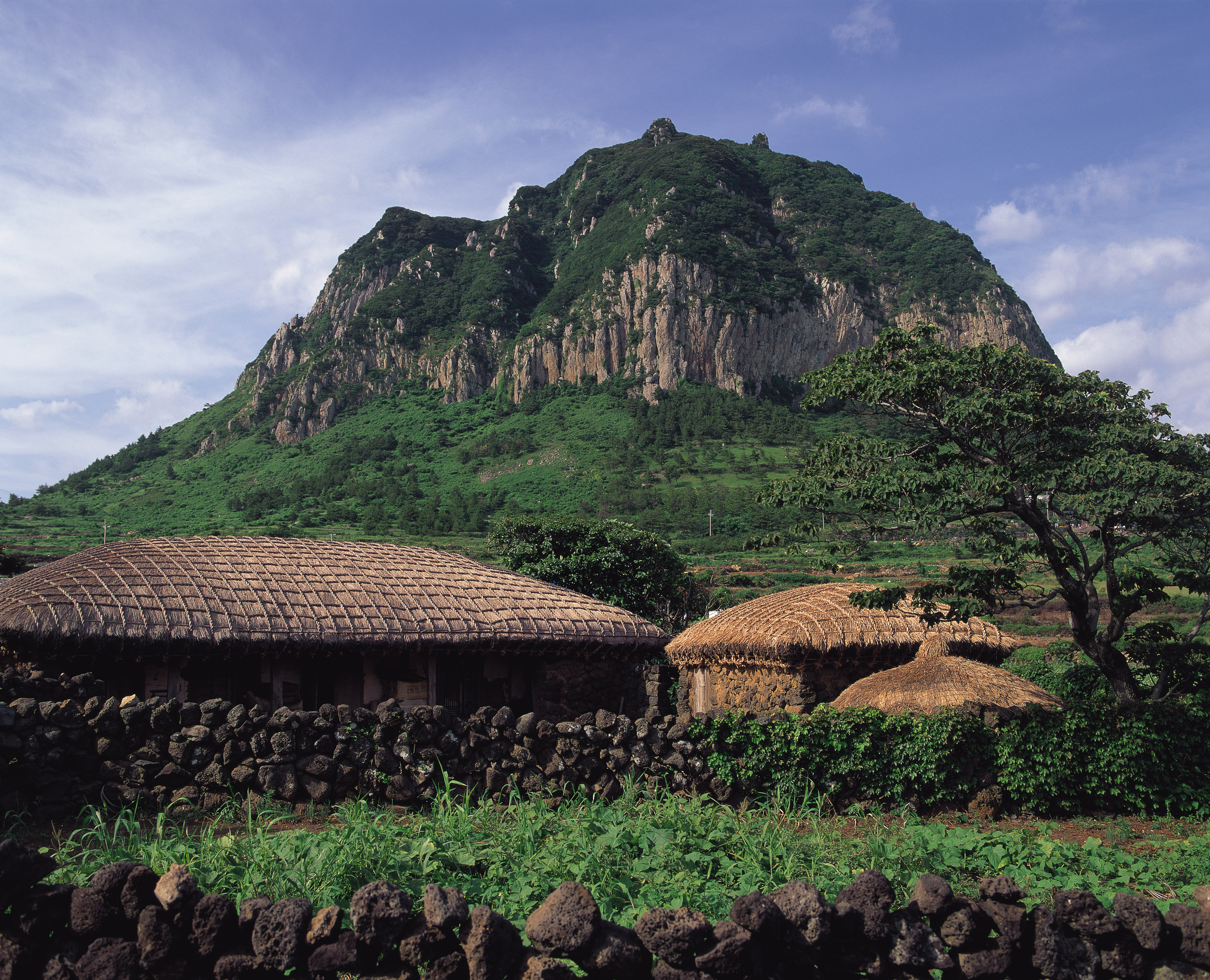
Sanbangsan (2011)

This is a list of 30 oreum in Andeok-myeon (안덕면)

- Gamnang Oreum (감낭오름; also 감남오름)
- Georin Oreum (거린오름; also 북오름)
- Goesuchi (괴수치; also 고수치)
- Gunsan Oreum (군산오름; also 굴뫼오름, 굴메, 군뫼)
- Geumsan (금산)
- Namsongi Oreum (남송이오름; also 남소로기)
- Neopge Oreum (넙게오름; also 광쳉이오름, 광해악)
- Non Oreum (논오름)
- Dansan (단산; also 바굼지오름, 바구미오름)
- Dang Oreum (당오름)
- Daebyeongak (대병악; also 골른오름, 여진머리오름, 큰오름)
- Doneori Oreum (도너리오름; also 돌오름, 돝내린오름)
- Dol Oreum (돌오름)
- Dombagi (돔박이)
- Mabogi Oreum (마복이오름; also 마보기, 맞보기)
- Muak (무악; also 무오름, 개오름, 믜오름, 미악, 술악)
- Balgeun Oreum (밝은오름; also 벌근오름)
- Sanbangsan (산방산; also 굴산)
- Sobyeongak (소병악; also 족은오름)
- Sinsan Oreum (신산오름)
- Sseogeundari (썩은다리; also 사간다리동산)
- Eo Oreum (어오름; also 어우름)
- Yeongari Oreum (영아리오름; also 서영아리)
- Wangime (왕이메)
- Yongmeori (용머리)
- Wonsuak (원수악; also 원물오름)
- Wollabong (월라봉; also 도래오름)
- Idoni Oreum (이돈이오름; also 이돈이)
- Jogeundaebiak (족은대비악; also 조근대비악)
- Hanuibok Oreum (하늬복오름; also 하늬복이, 하늬보기, 하네보기)

=== Pyoseon-myeon ===
This is a list of 26 oreum in Pyoseon-myeon (표선면)

- Gamuni Oreum (가문이오름; also 감은이오름, 거문오름)
- Gase Oreum (가세오름)
- Gapseoni Oreum (갑선이오름)
- Gae Oreum (개오름)
- Guduri Oreum (구두리오름)
- Dalsanbong (달산봉; also 탈산봉, 당산봉)
- Daeroksan (대록산; also 큰사슴이)
- Ttarabi Oreum (따라비오름; also 따래비, 땅하래비)
- Mae Oreum (매오름)
- Moji Oreum (모지오름; also 뭇지오름)
- Baegyagi Oreum (백약이오름)
- Beonneol Oreum (번널오름; also 번늘오름)
- Byeonggot Oreum (병곳오름; also 뱅곳오름, 안좌오름)
- Bungmangsan (북망산; also 토산봉 알오름)
- Bulgeun Oreum (붉은오름; also)
- Saekki Oreum (새끼오름; also 샛기오름)
- Seol Oreum (설오름; also 서오름, 서을악)
- Soroksan (소록산; also 족은사슴이)
- So Oreum (소오름; also 쇠오름, 솔오름)
- Aseumseoni (아슴선이; also 아심선이)
- Yeomunyeongari (여문영아리)
- Yeongjusan (영주산)
- Jangja Oreum (장자오름)
- Jwabomi (좌보미)
- Chenmang Oreum (쳇망오름)
- Tosanbong (토산봉; also 망오름)

=== Hangyeong-myeon ===
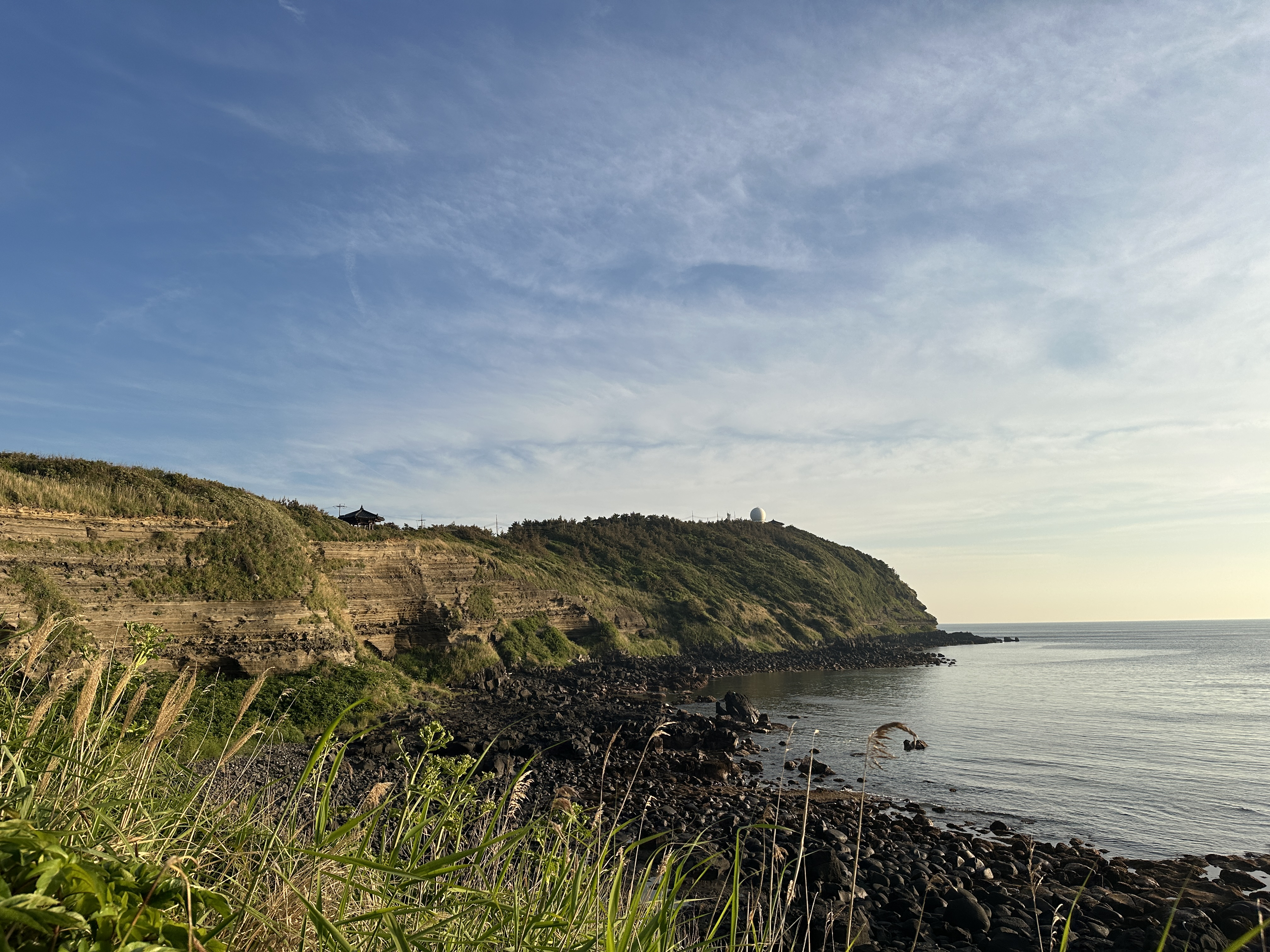
Suwolbong (2026)

This is a list of 12 oreum in Hangyeong-myeon (한경면)

- Gama Oreum (가마오름)
- Gamechang (가메창; also 암메)
- Gubeun Oreum (굽은오름; also 구분오름)
- Dangsanbong (당산봉; also 당오름, 차귀오름)
- Ma Oreum (마오름)
- Majung Oreum (마중오름; also 마종이)
- Saesin Oreum (새신오름; also 신서악, 조소악)
- Songa Oreum (송아오름)
- Suwolbong (수월봉; also 노꼬물오름, 물노리오름)
- Igye Oreum (이계오름)
- Jeoji Oreum (저지오름; also 닥몰오름, 새오름)
- Panpo Oreum (판포오름; also 널개오름)

=== Udo-myeon ===
This is a list of 1 oreum in Udo-myeon (우도면)

- Soemeori Oreum (쇠머리오름; also 섬머리)

== See also ==
- List of World Heritage Sites in South Korea
