= Naegwang-ri =

- Ri (administrative division)
- Location within Ulsan
- Coordinates: 35.4281°N 129.2190°E
- Country: South Korea

Population (2012)
  - Total: 246
- Website: onyang.ulju.ulsan.kr (in Korean)

Korean name
- Hangul: 내광리
- Hanja: 內光里
- RR: Naegwang-ri
- MR: Naegwang-ri

Naegwang-ri (Korean: 내광리) is an administrative division, or village, located in Onyang, Ulju County, Ulsan, South Korea. It is located west of Oegwang-ri, just north of Daeunsan mountain.
