= Dongsang-ri =

- Ri (administrative division)
- Location within Ulsan
- Coordinates: 35.4182°N 129.2964°E
- Country: South Korea

Population (2012)
  - Total: 438
- Website: onyang.ulju.ulsan.kr (in Korean)

Korean name
- Hangul: 동상리
- Hanja: 東上里
- RR: Dongsang-ri
- MR: Tongsang-ri

Dongsang-ri (Korean: 동상리) is an administrative division, or village, located in Onyang, Ulju County, Ulsan, South Korea. It is located east of Namchang-ri, just north of Bal-ri.
