= Bal-ri =

- Ri (administrative division)
- Location within Ulsan
- Coordinates: 35.3955°N 129.2918°E
- Country: South Korea

Population (2012)
  - Total: 1,756
- Website: onyang.ulju.ulsan.kr (in Korean)

Korean name
- Hangul: 발리
- Hanja: 鉢里
- RR: Bal-ri
- MR: Pal-li

Bal-ri (Korean: 발리) is an administrative division, or village, located in Onyang, Ulju County, Ulsan, South Korea. It is located east of Daean-ri, just south of Dongsang-ri.
