= Daeunsan =

Mountain in Onyang, Ulsan, South Korea

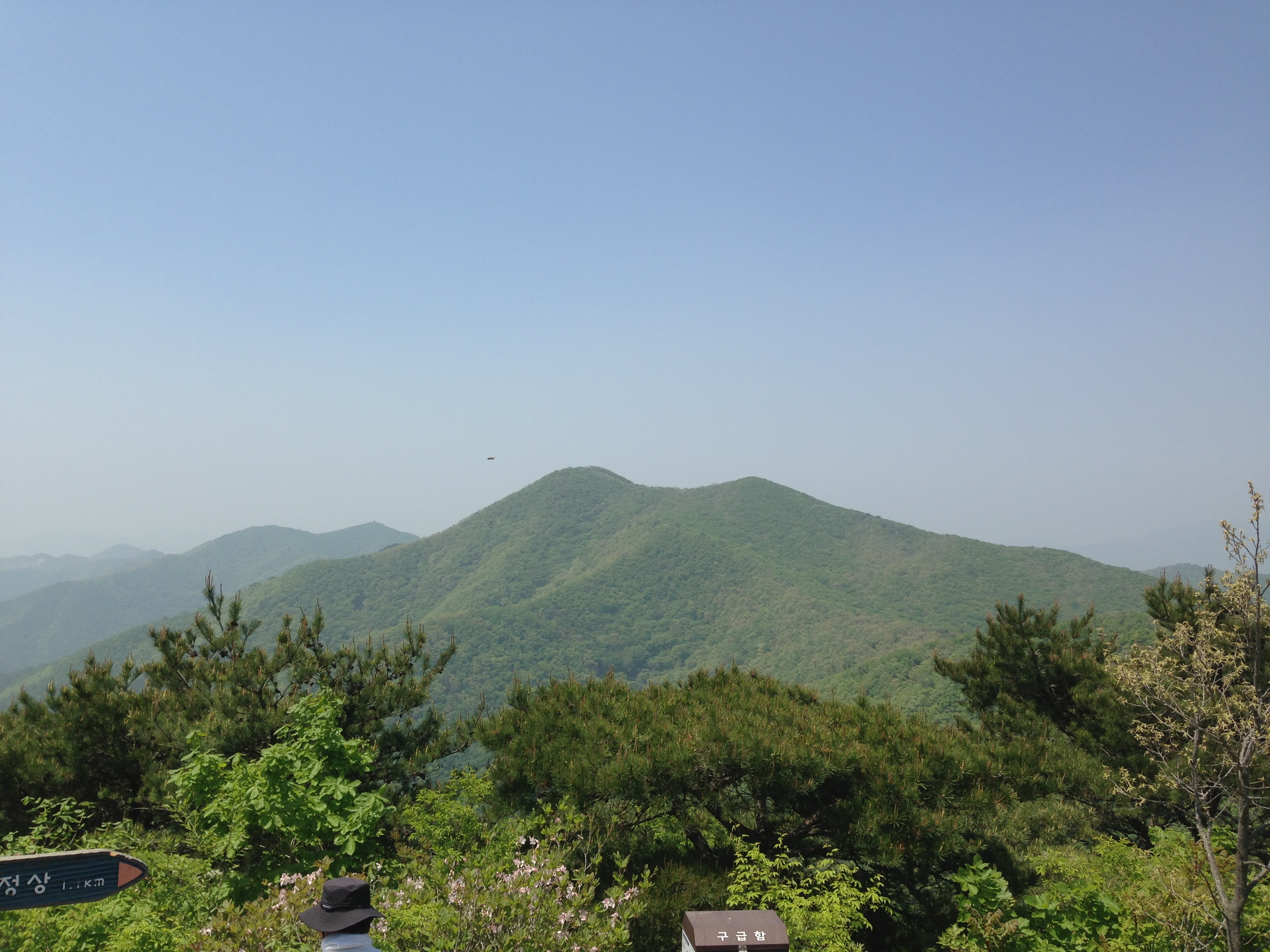
- View of Daeunsan's summit

Highest point
- Elevation: 742 m (2,434 ft)
- Coordinates: 35°24′07″N 129°12′48″E

Geography
- Location: South Korea

Korean name
- Hangul: 대운산
- Hanja: 大雲山
- RR: Daeunsan
- MR: Taeunsan

Daeunsan (Korean: 대운산) is a mountain located in Onyang, Ulju County, Ulsan, South Korea. It sits on the boundary between the districts of Oegwang-ri and Unhwa-ri in South Gyeongsang Province. Daeunsan has an elevation of 742 m (2,434 ft). The mountain was previously named Bulgwangsan.

== See also ==
- Geography of Korea
- List of South Korean tourist attractions
- List of mountains in Korea
- List of mountains by elevation
