= Unhwa-ri =

Village in Ulsan, South Korea

- Ri (administrative division)
- Location within Ulsan
- Coordinates: 35.3969°N 129.2373°E
- Country: South Korea

Population (2012)
  - Total: 4,045
- Website: onyang.ulju.ulsan.kr (in Korean)

Korean name
- Hangul: 운화리
- Hanja: 雲化里
- RR: Unhwa-ri
- MR: Unhwa-ri

Unhwa-ri (Korean: 운화리) is an administrative division, or village, located in Onyang, Ulju County, Ulsan, South Korea. It is located west of the Busan-Ulsan expressway, just south of Oegwang-ri.
