= Gosan-ri =

- Ri (administrative division)
- Oegosan Onggi Village

- Location within Ulsan
- Coordinates: 35.4373°N 129.2714°E
- Country: South Korea

Population (2012)
  - Total: 485
- Website: onyang.ulju.ulsan.kr (in Korean)

Korean name
- Hangul: 고산리
- Hanja: 高山里
- RR: Gosan-ri
- MR: Kosan-ri

Gosan-ri (Korean: 고산리) is an administrative division, or village, located in Onyang, Ulju County, Ulsan, South Korea. It is located west of the Busan-Ulsan expressway and east of Samgwang-ri.
