= Mangyang-ri =

- Ri (administrative division)
- Location within Ulsan
- Coordinates: 35.4501°N 129.2866°E
- Country: South Korea

Population (2012)
  - Total: 2,363
- Website: onyang.ulju.ulsan.kr (in Korean)

Korean name
- Hangul: 망양리
- Hanja: 望陽里
- RR: Mangyang-ri
- MR: Mangyang-ri

Mangyang-ri (Korean: 망양리) is an administrative division, or village, located in Onyang, Ulju County, Ulsan, South Korea. It is located east of the Busan-Ulsan expressway and north of Namchang-ri.
