= Daean-ri =

- Ri (administrative division)
- Location within Ulsan
- Coordinates: 35.4038°N 129.2788°E
- Country: South Korea

Population (2012)
  - Total: 14,037
- Website: onyang.ulju.ulsan.kr (in Korean)

Korean name
- Hangul: 대안리
- Hanja: 大安里
- RR: Daean-ri
- MR: Taean-ri

Daean-ri (Korean: 대안리) is an administrative division, or village, located in Onyang, Ulju County, Ulsan, South Korea. It is located east of the Busan-Ulsan expressway, just south of Namchang-ri.
