= Suwolbong =

Hill in Jeju Province, South Korea

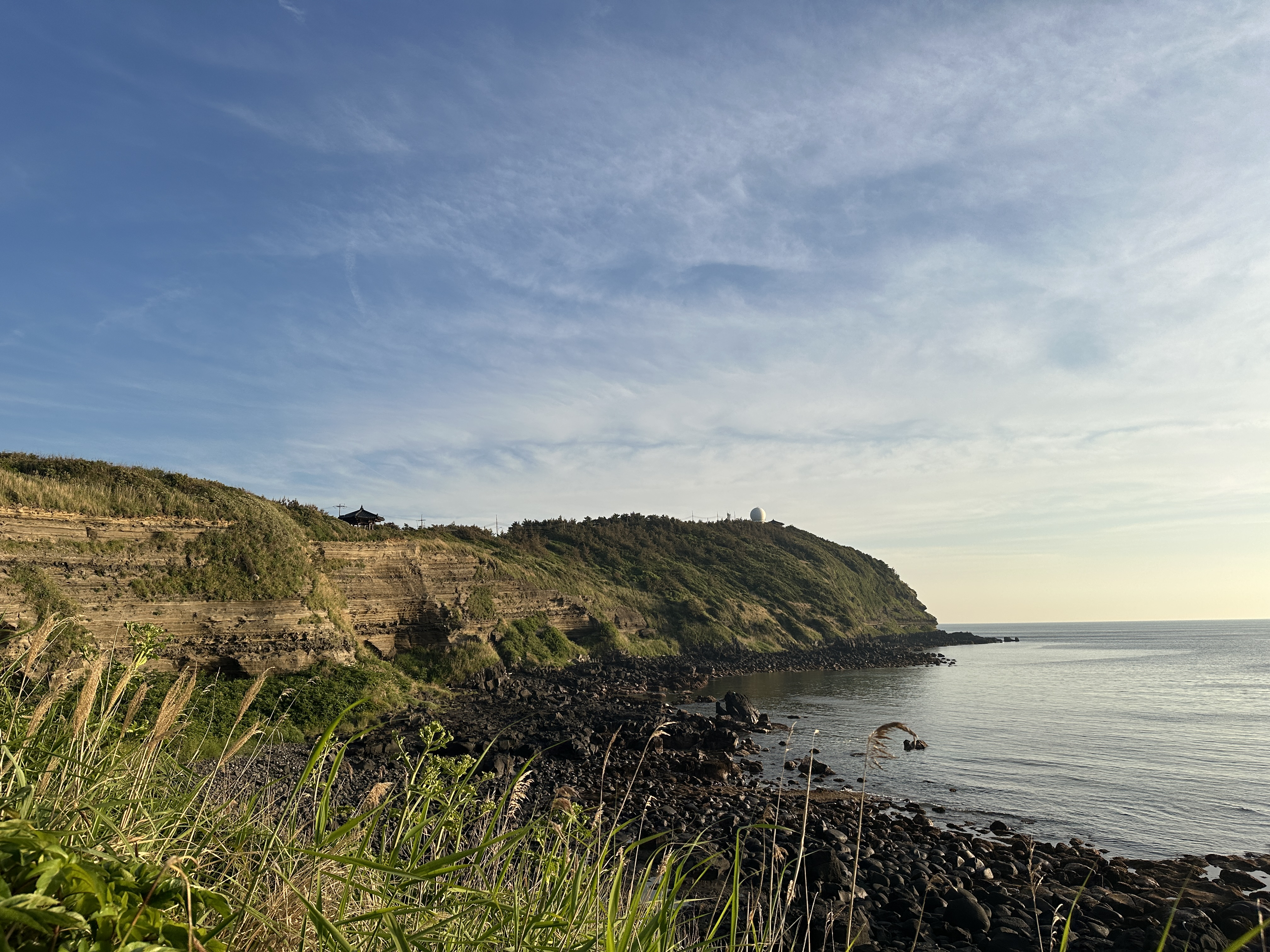
- Suwolbong (center), viewed from the walking trail to the south (2026)

Highest point
- Coordinates: 33.2945°N 126.1632°E

Geography

Korean name
- Hangul: 수월봉
- Hanja: 水月峰
- RR: Suwolbong
- MR: Suwŏlbong

Suwolbong (Korean: 수월봉) is an oreum (small extinct volcano) in Hangyeong, Jeju City, Jeju Province, South Korea. Its peak is 77m above sea level.

The volcano was formed 18,000 years ago and has a 73m tuff ring. The cliffs of the mountain have been eroded due to the nearby ocean, and are considered to clearly and beautifully show the various sedimentary layers of the volcano. For this reason, the mountain's cliffs were designated Natural Monument of South Korea No. 513 in 2009.

The coastal cliffs of the mountain extend for around 2km and are called Eongal 엉알. There is a trail along the cliffs that tourists can walk along. The trail not only has scenic views of the cliffs and Suwolbong, but also of the ocean and nearby islands of Chagwido. There has been an annual walking event held at the trail since 2010.

== Gallery ==
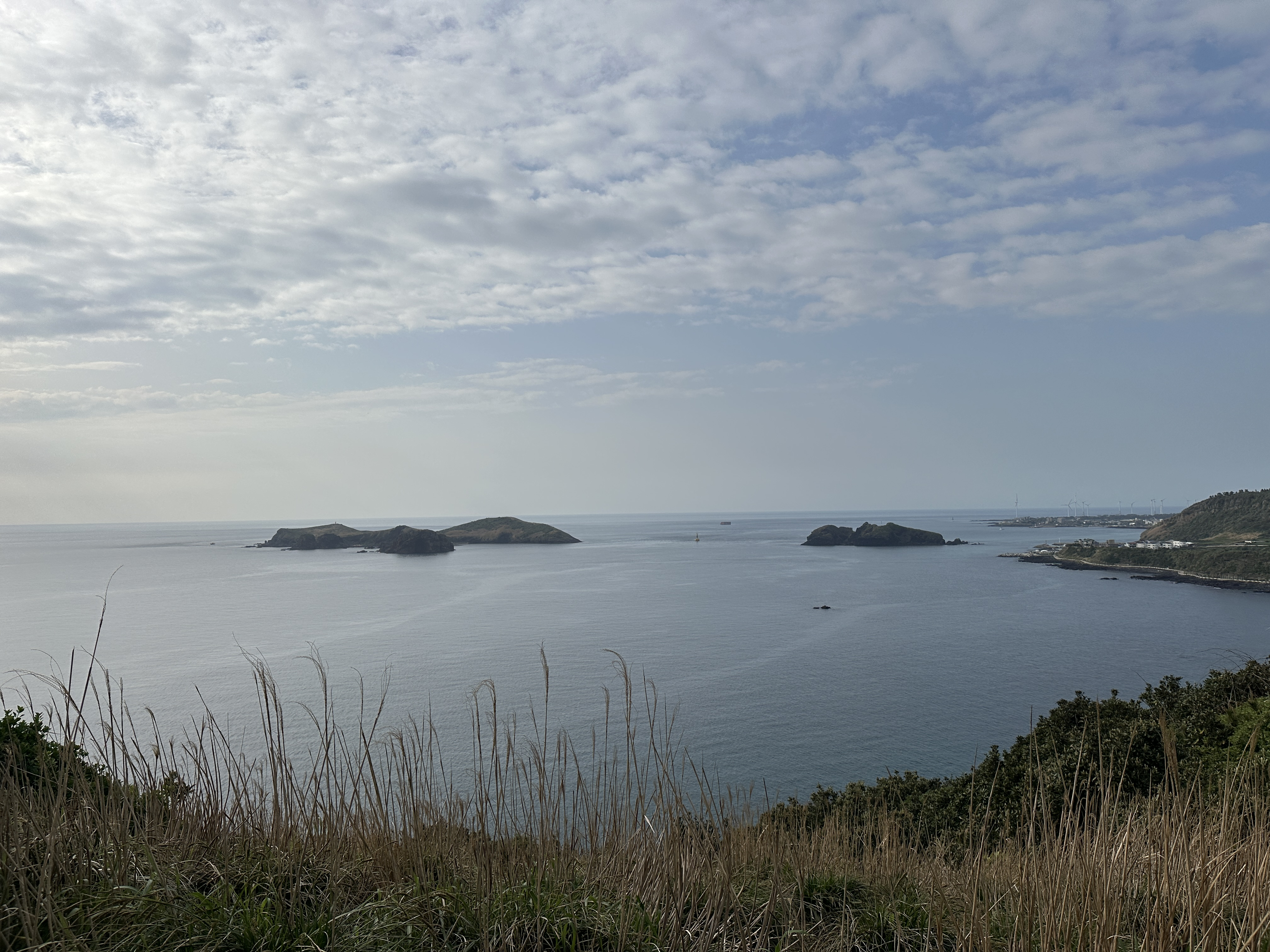
View of the ocean and Chagwido from the hill (2026)

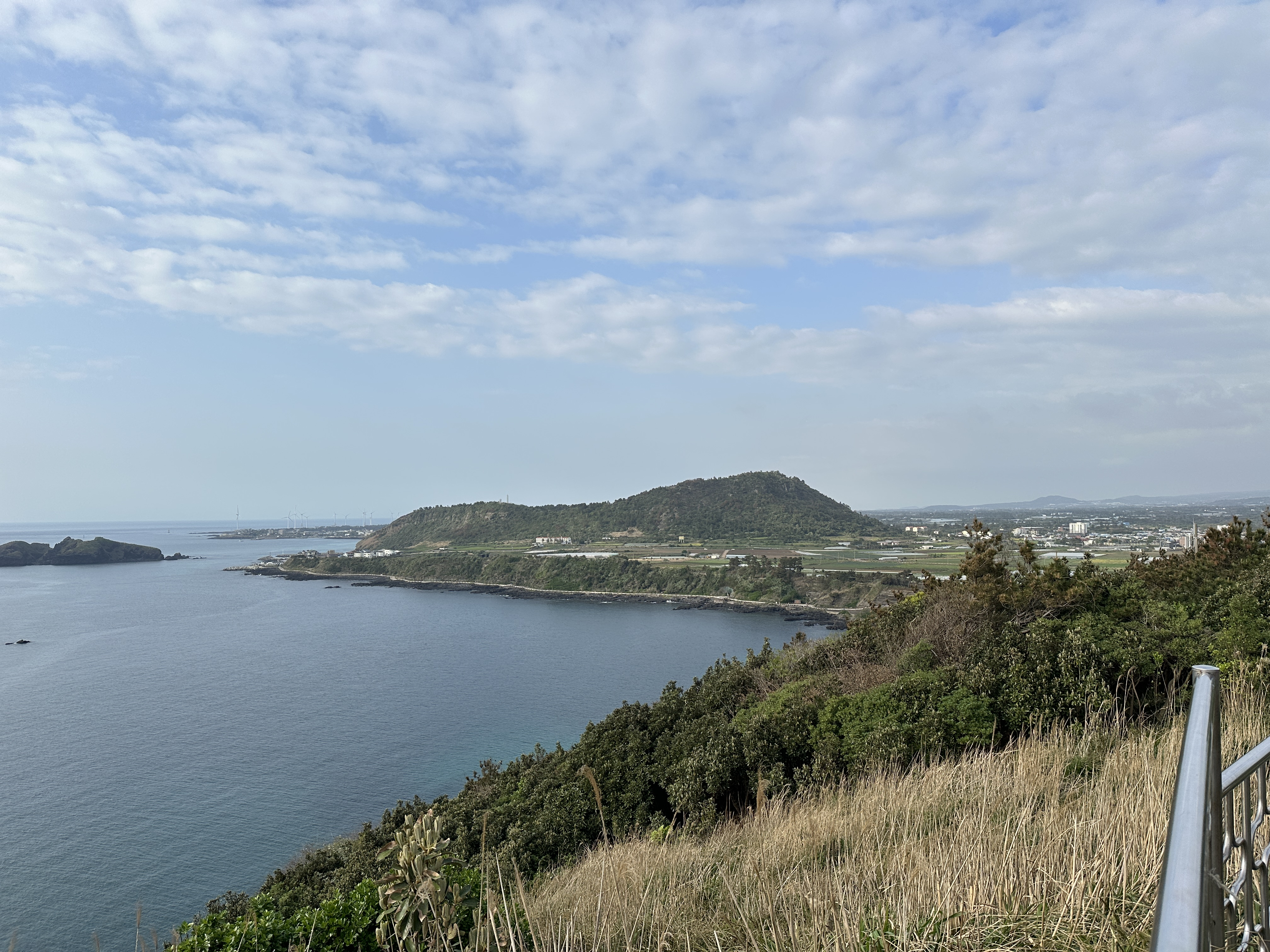
View of the nearby hill Dangsanbong from the hill (2026)

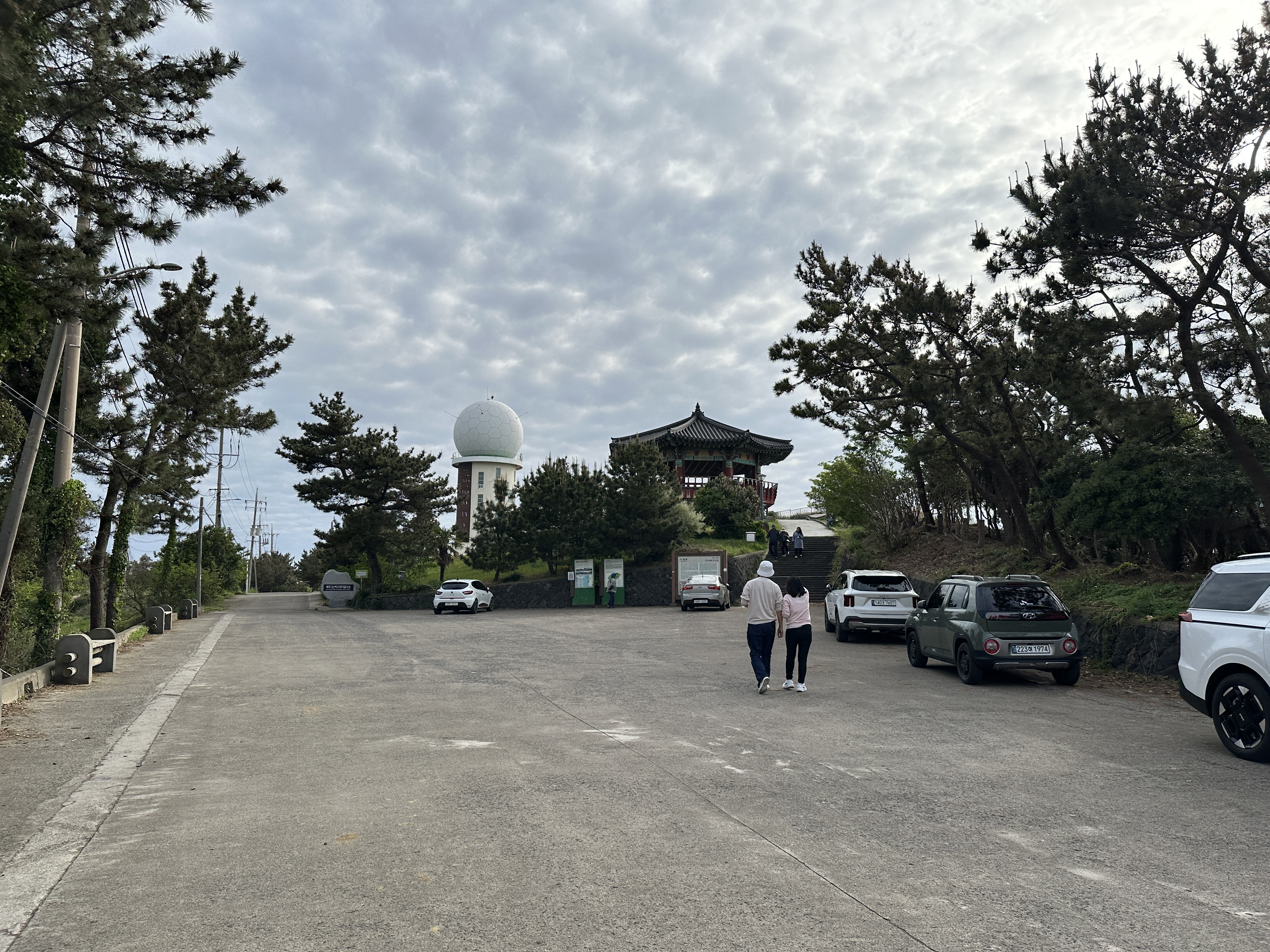
Parking lot and structures on top of the hill (2026)

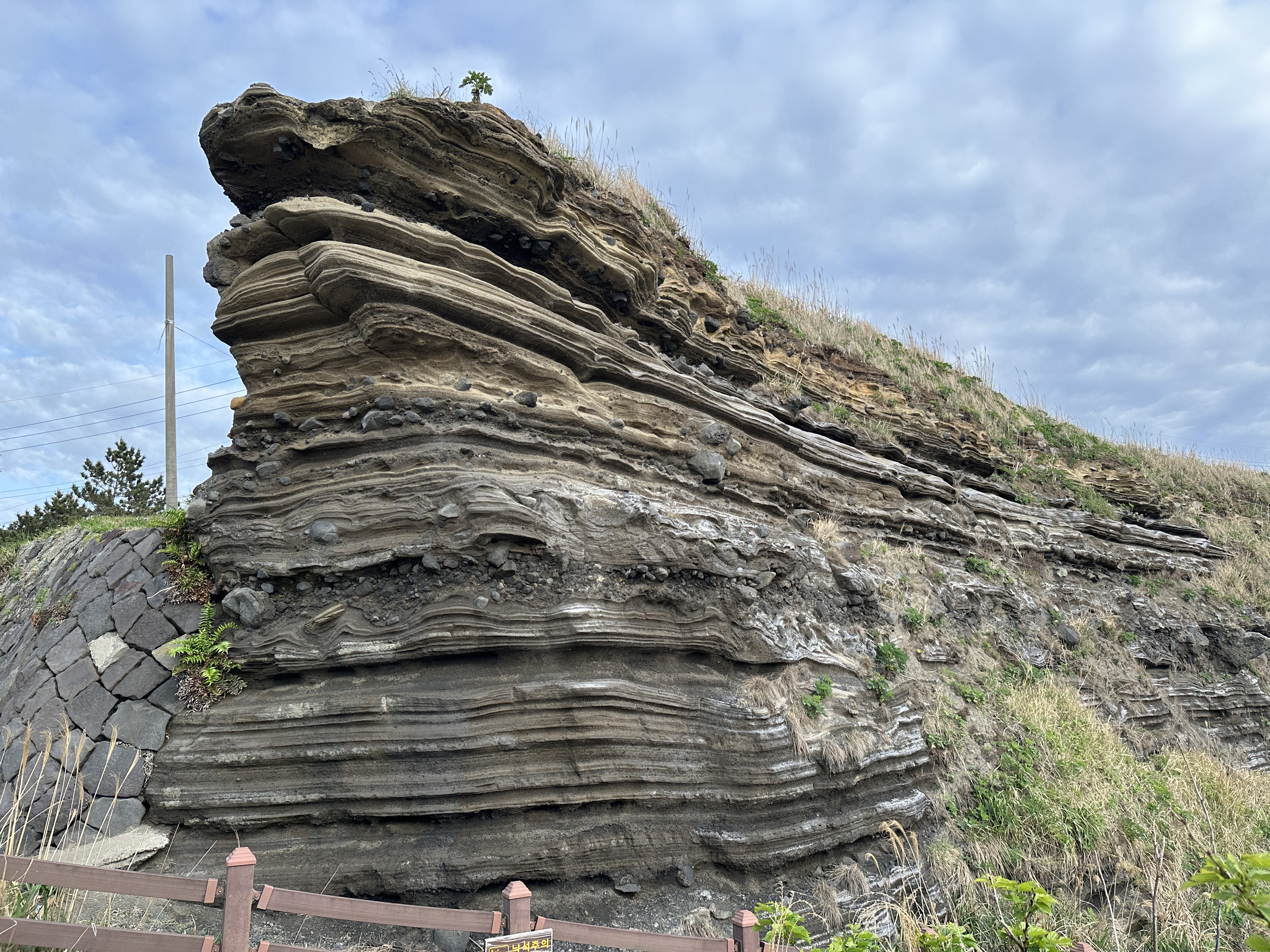
Part of the cliffs, with layers exposed (2026)

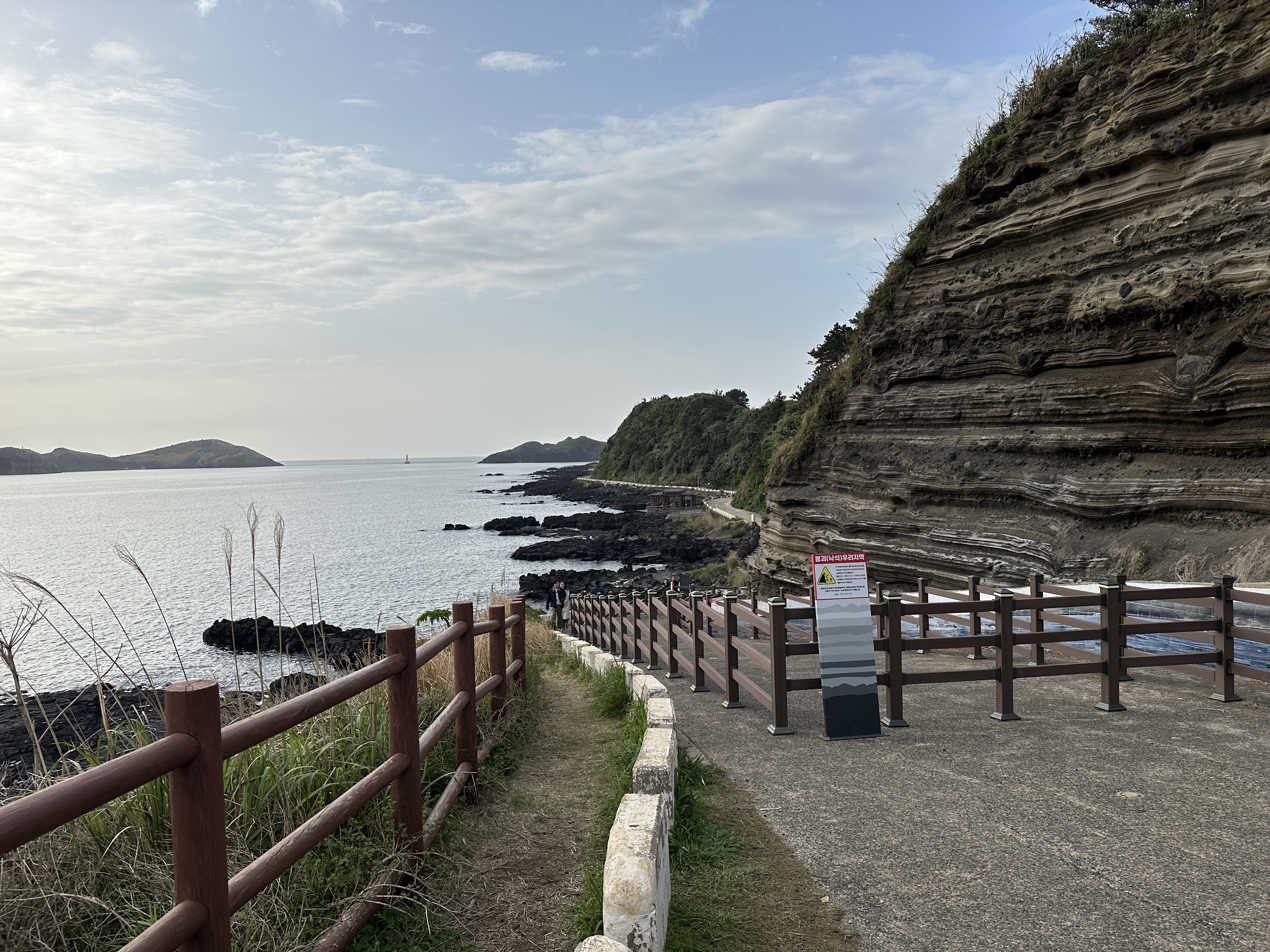
Hiking trail (2026)
