= Beomseo-eup =

Town in Ulsan, South Korea

Beomseo
- Eup
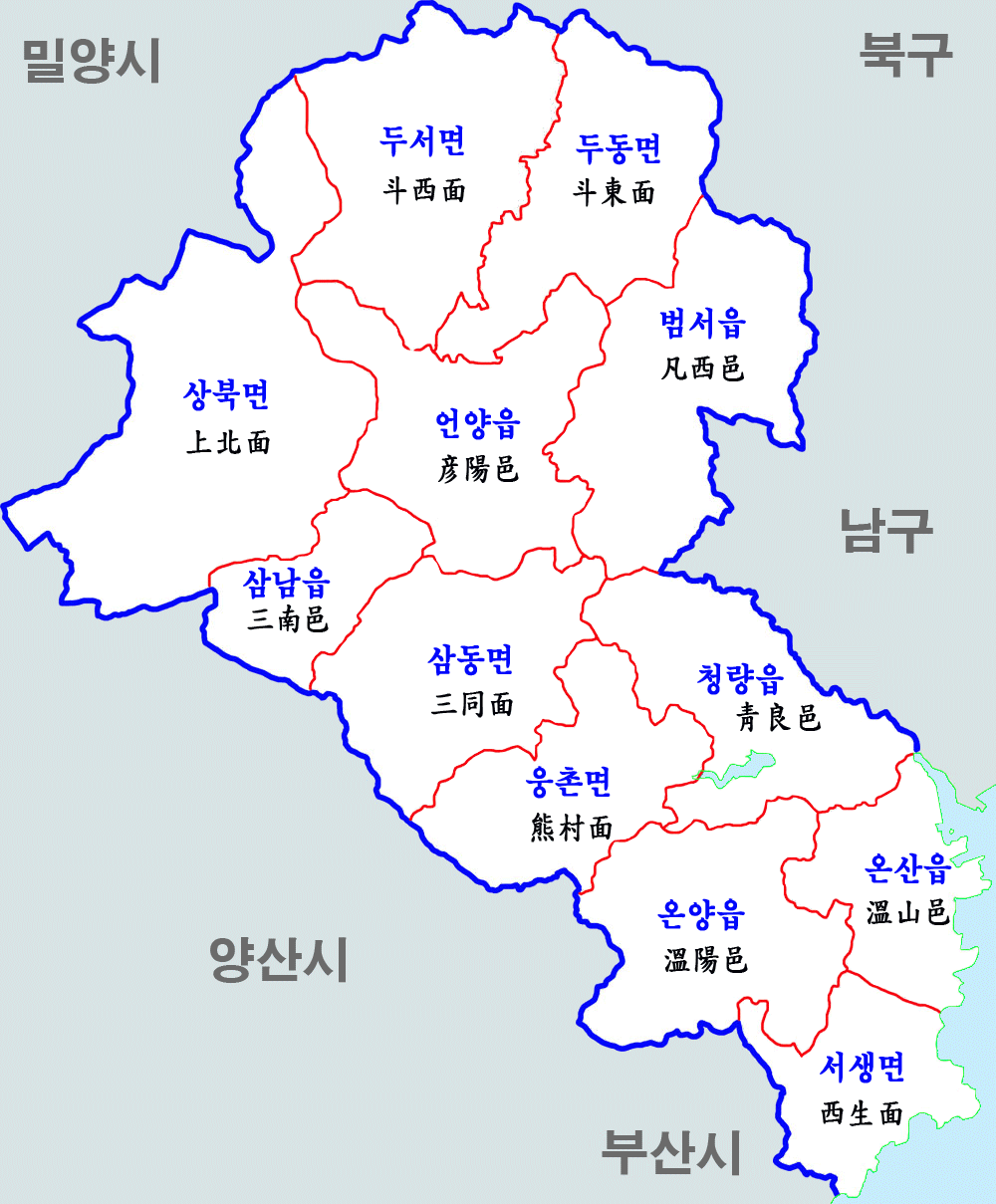
- Map of Ulju County. Beomseo is depicted in the northeast.

- Location within Ulsan Location within South Korea
- Coordinates: 35°35′49″N 129°14′48″E
- Country: South Korea
- Province: Ulsan
- County: Ulju

Area
  - Total: 77.1 km^{2} (29.8 sq mi)
- Elevation: 113 m (371 ft)

Population (2023)
  - Total: 68,051
  - Density: 883/km^{2} (2,290/sq mi)

Korean name
- Hangul: 범서읍
- Hanja: 凡西邑
- RR: Beomseo-eup
- MR: Pŏmsŏ-ŭp

Beomseo (Korean: 범서읍) is an eup of Ulju County, Ulsan, South Korea. It is located to the east of Muhak Mountain, at an average elevation of 133 meters above the sea level. As of the year 2023, it had a total population of 68,051.

== Administrative divisions ==
As of February 2023, Beomseo consists of 10 villages, called ri. They are:

Map
Villages	Hangul	Hanja	Population
Guyeong-ri	구영리	九英里	30,016
Cheonsang-ri	천상리	川上里	19,940
Gulhwa-ri	굴화리	屈火里	15,746
Cheokgwari-ri	척과리	尺果里	976
Doosan-ri	두산리	斗山里	641
Seosa-ri	서사리	西砂里	164
Ipam-ri	입암리	立岩里	352
Sayeon-ri	사연리	泗淵里	272
Jung-ri	중리	中里	254
Mangseong-ri	망성리	望星里	251
