= Samgwang-ri =

- Ri (administrative division)
- Location within Ulsan
- Coordinates: 35.4431°N 129.2467°E
- Country: South Korea

Population (2012)
  - Total: 328
- Website: onyang.ulju.ulsan.kr (in Korean)

Korean name
- Hangul: 삼광리
- Hanja: 三光里
- RR: Samgwang-ri
- MR: Samgwang-ri

Samgwang-ri (Korean: 삼광리) is an administrative division, or village, located in Onyang, Ulju County, Ulsan, South Korea. It is located west of the Busan-Ulsan expressway, just north of Oegwang-ri.
