= Mangyang =

Mangyang may refer to:

- Mangyang-ri
- Mangyang station
- Nikyob name of Kafanchan, Nigeria
