= Gama Oreum =

Small extinct volcano in Jeju City, South Korea

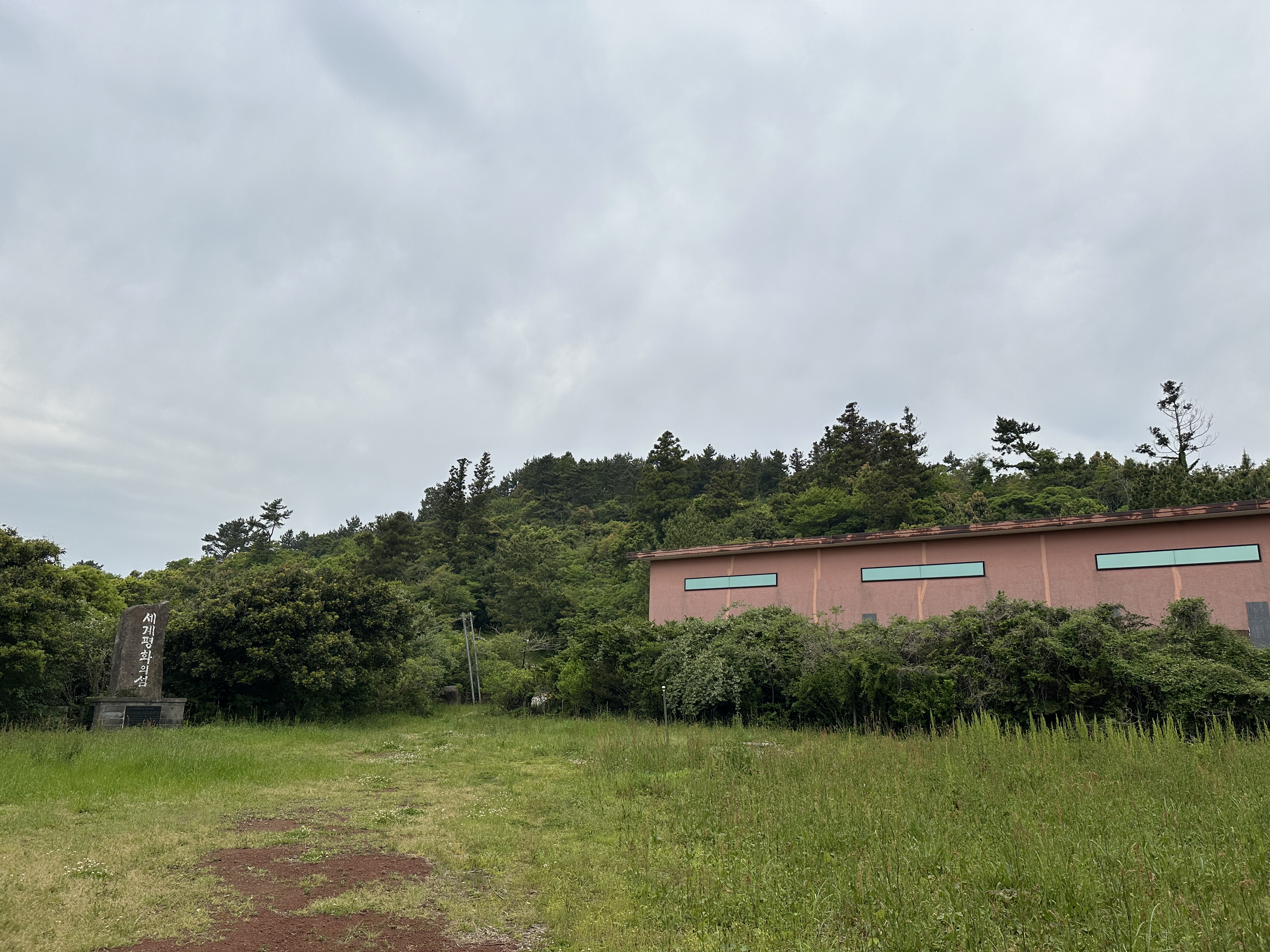
- The hill from the south (2026)

Highest point
- Elevation: 140.5 m (461 ft)
- Coordinates: 33.3055°N 126.2468°E

Geography
- Location: Cheongsu-ri, Hangyeong-myeon, Jeju City, Jeju Province, South Korea

Gama Oreum (Korean: 가마오름) is an oreum (small extinct volcano; parasitic cones) in Cheongsu-ri, Hangyeong-myeon, Jeju City, Jeju Province, South Korea.

== Description ==
The oreum is named for and said to resemble gamasot, traditional Korean pots. An alternate pronunciation for the name is Game Oreum (가메오름), and the name's Hanja is read as "Buak".

The oreum is 140.5 m (461 ft) above sea level, and 51 m (167 ft) higher than the surrounding area. It is considered fairly easy to hike up, and takes around 20 minutes to reach the top. It occupies an area of 2,059 m^{2} (22,160 ft^{2}). It has a horseshoe-shaped crater that opens to the northeast. It is surrounded by farmland and a rural community.

During the 1910–1945 Japanese colonial period, the Japanese military used the oreum as a base. During World War II, in anticipation of an eventual Allied invasion of Korea that never came to pass, tunnels were dug into the oreum. These tunnels now remain, and total around 1.5 km (0.93 mi) in length. Jejuans were pressed into forced labor to create these tunnels, which were largely forgotten until the 21st century.

At the base of the oreum and near the tunnels is the Jeju Peace Museum, which opened in 2004. The tunnels were available for tourist entry until 2013, when they were deemed unsafe and closed. Efforts were made to renovate and stabilize them, but by 2018 did not result in their reopening.

== Gallery ==
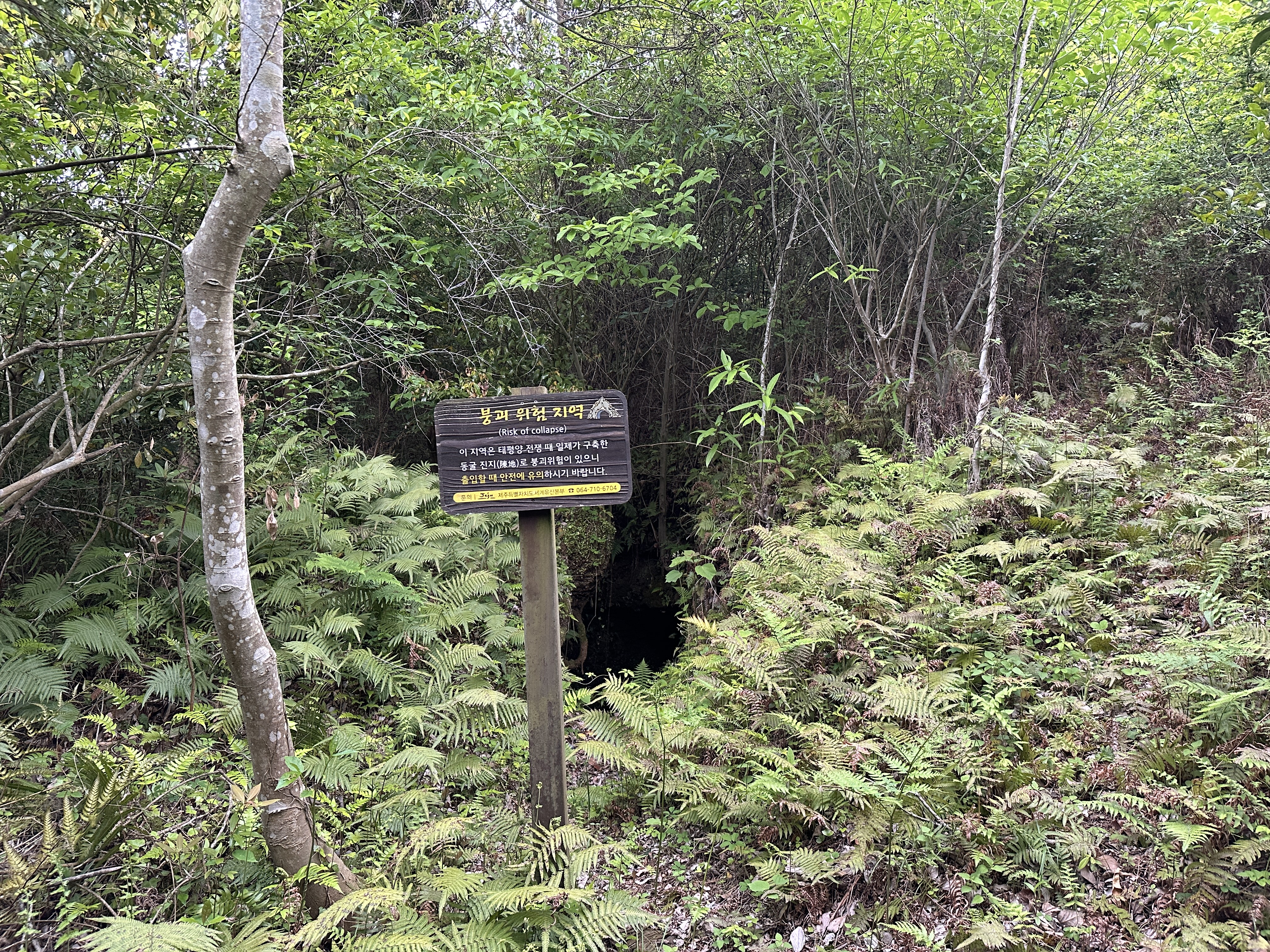
Entrance to one of the Japanese tunnels (2026)

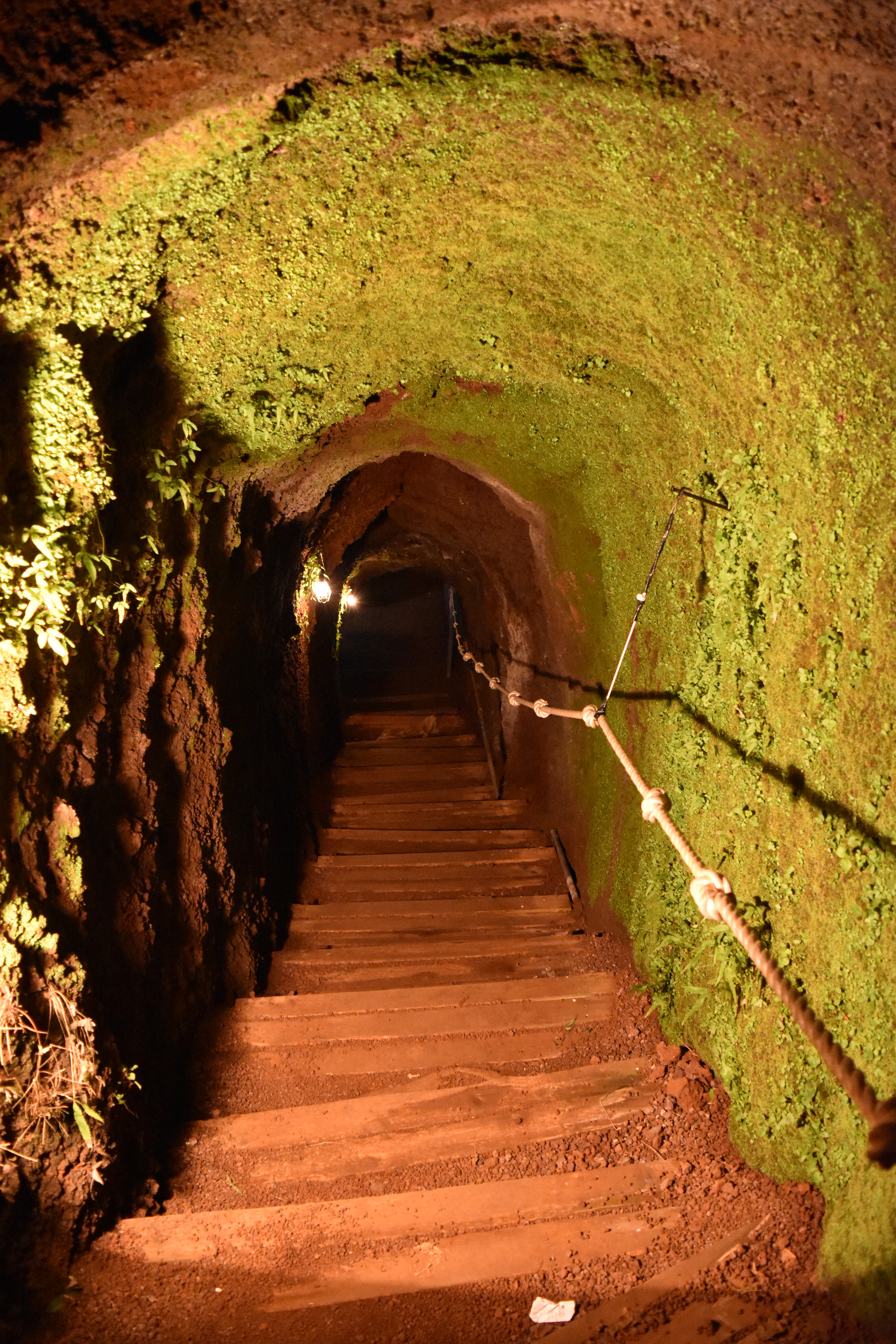
Inside a tunnel (2018)

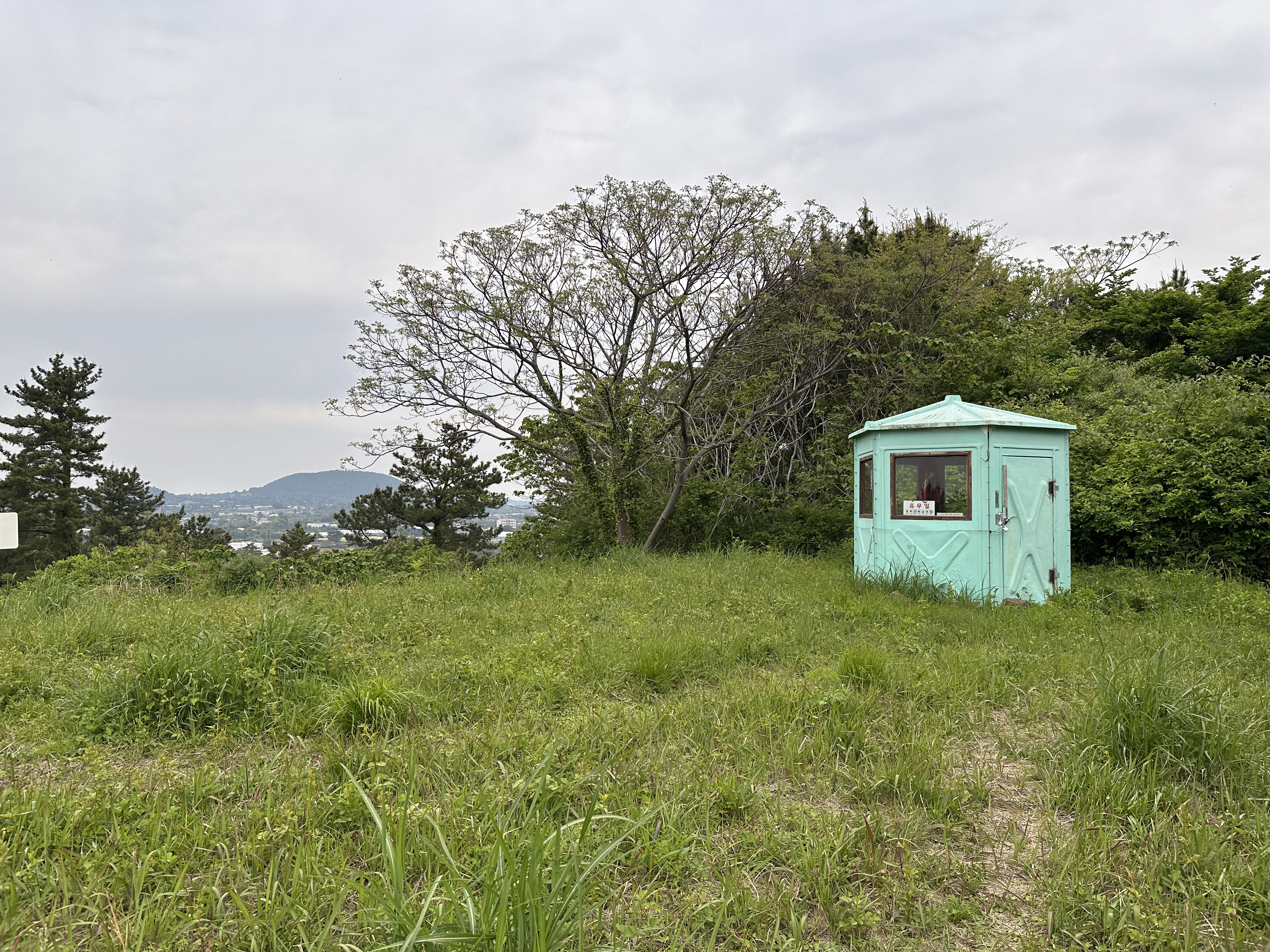
Top of the oreum (2026)

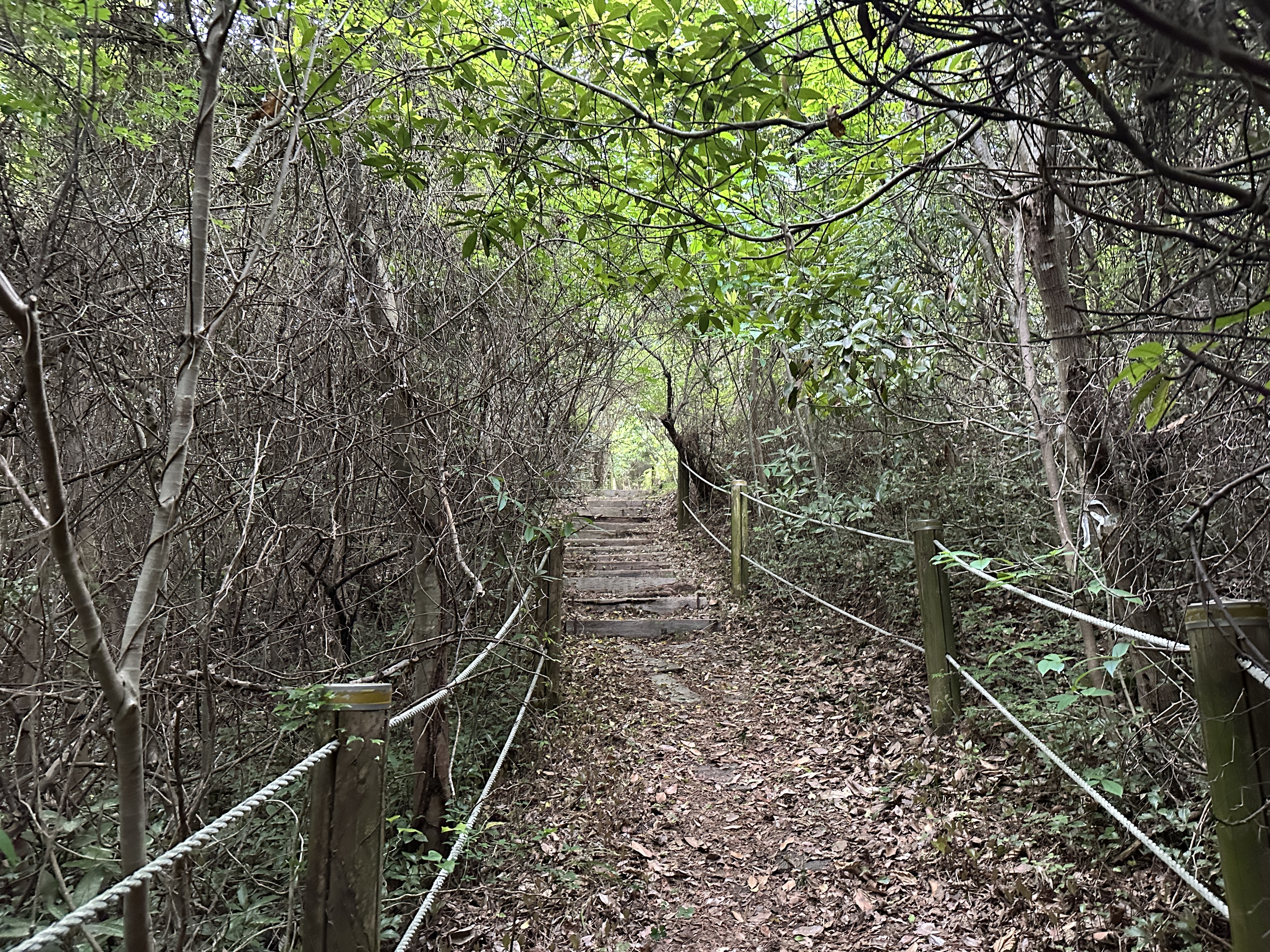
Hiking trail (2026)

== See also ==
- Oreum#List of oreum
