= Sinchang Windmill Coastal Road =

Scenic road in Jeju City, South Korea

Coordinates: 33.3429°N 126.1712°E

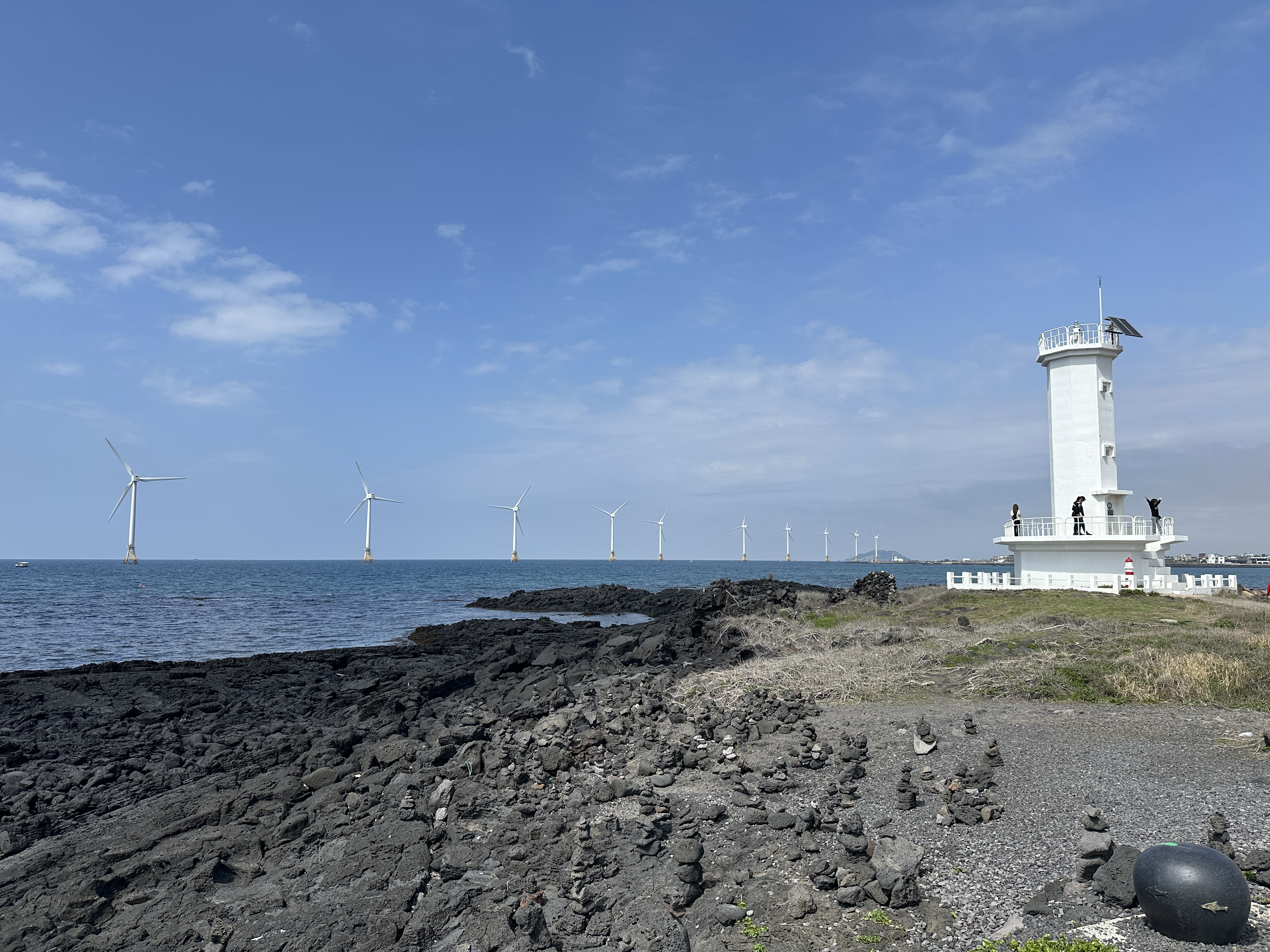
Part of the coastline, with wind turbines and lighthouse visible (2026)

Sinchang Windmill Coastal Road (Korean: 신창풍차해안도로) is a scenic area in Sinchang-ri, Hangyeong-myeon, Jeju City, Jeju Province, South Korea. The area contains numerous wind turbines in an offshore wind farm. The area is considered to have a beautiful sunset and is popular for walks and taking pictures.

There are walking paths in the sea that were opened in 2014; these are meant for maintaining the wind turbines, but are also used by tourists. During high tide, the path can become submerged. Access is restricted during such periods.

== Gallery ==
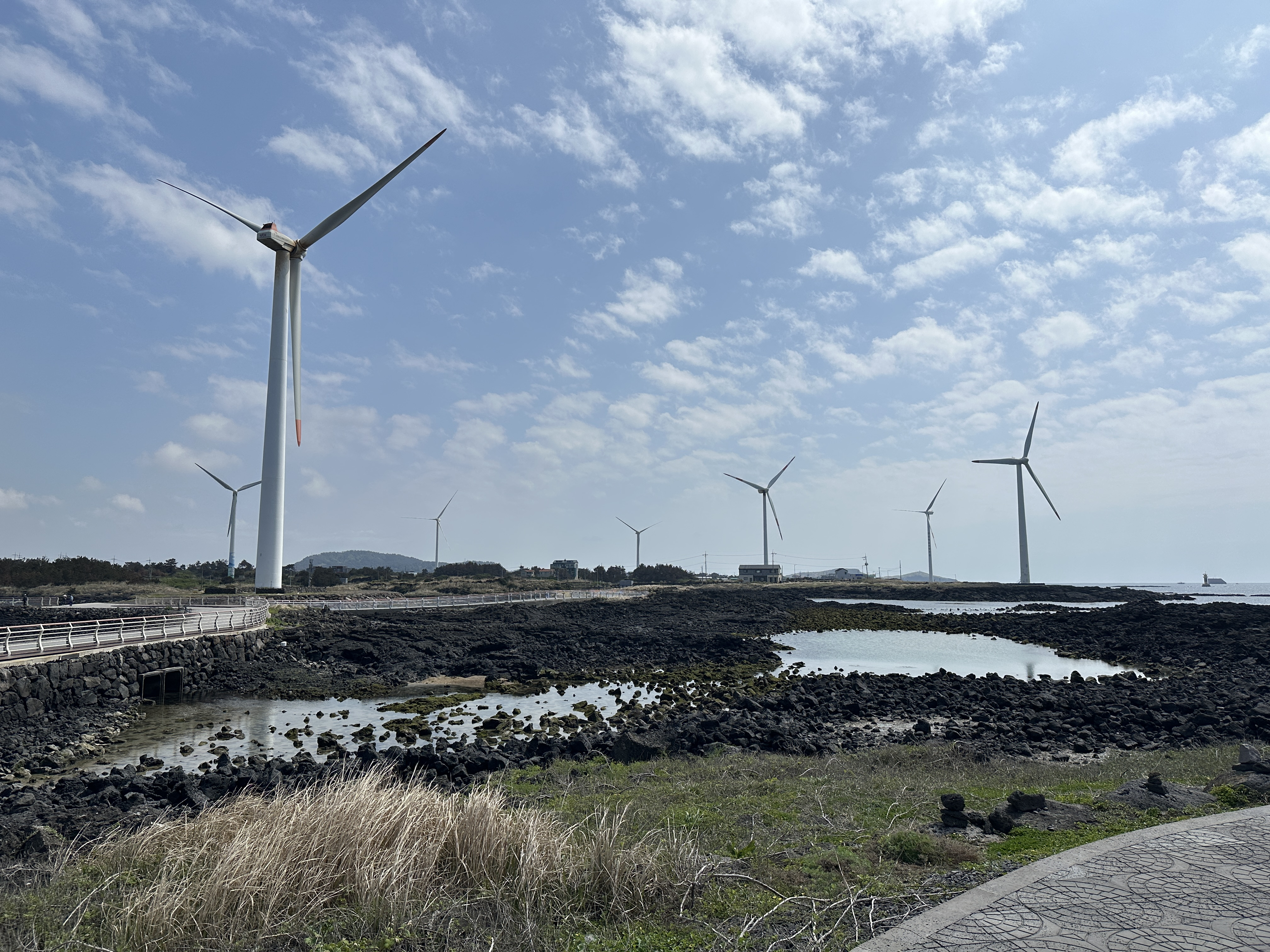
View of some turbines (2026)

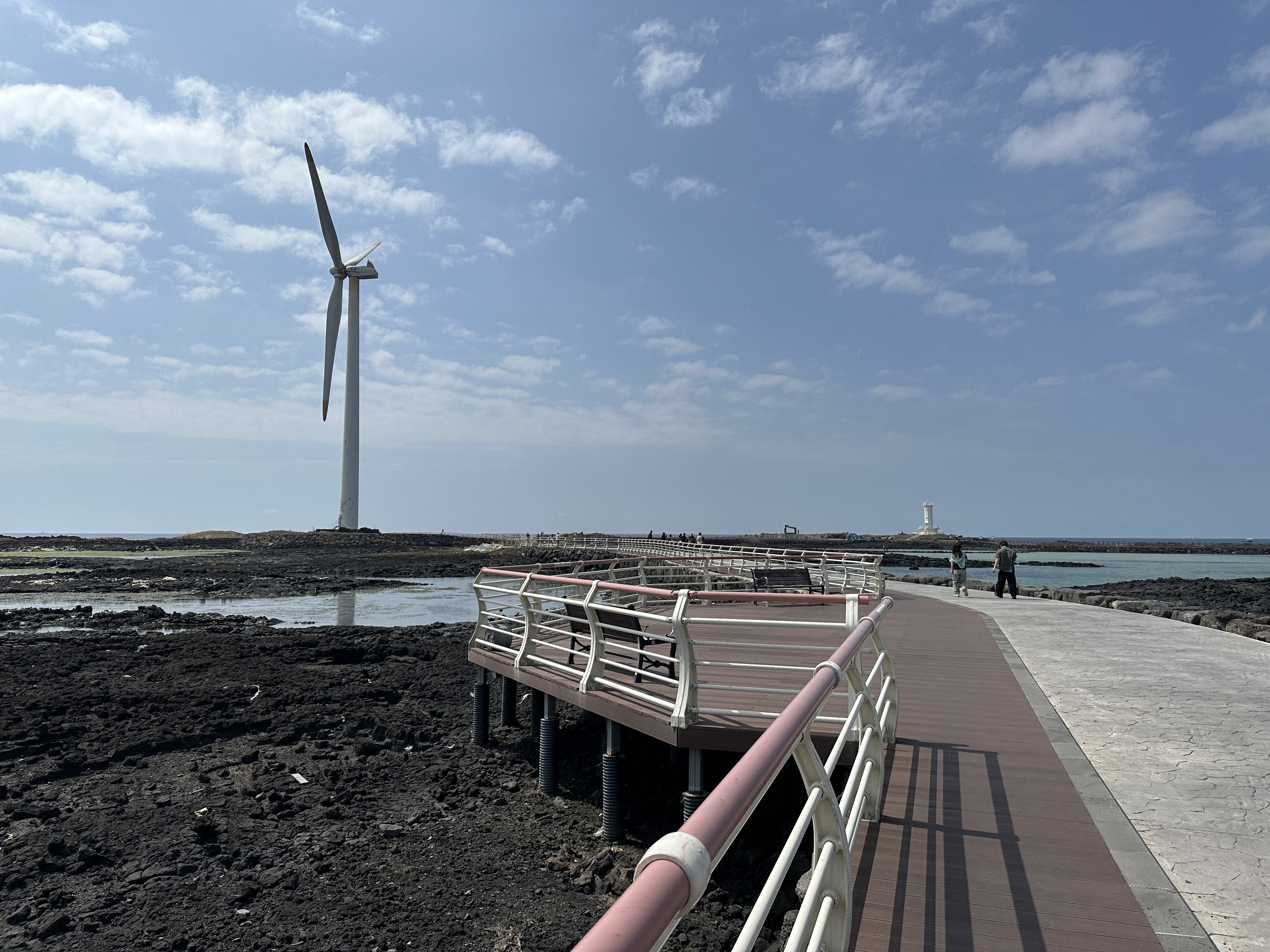
Boardwalk path (2026)
