= Jukdo =

Jukdo may refer to:

- Jukdo (island), in North Gyeongsang Province, South Korea
- Jukdo, one of the two islands of Chagwido, in Jeju Province, South Korea
- Jukdo, the name of other islands of South Korea
- Jukdo market, Pohang, South Korea
