= Jeoji Oreum =

Hill in Jeju Province, South Korea

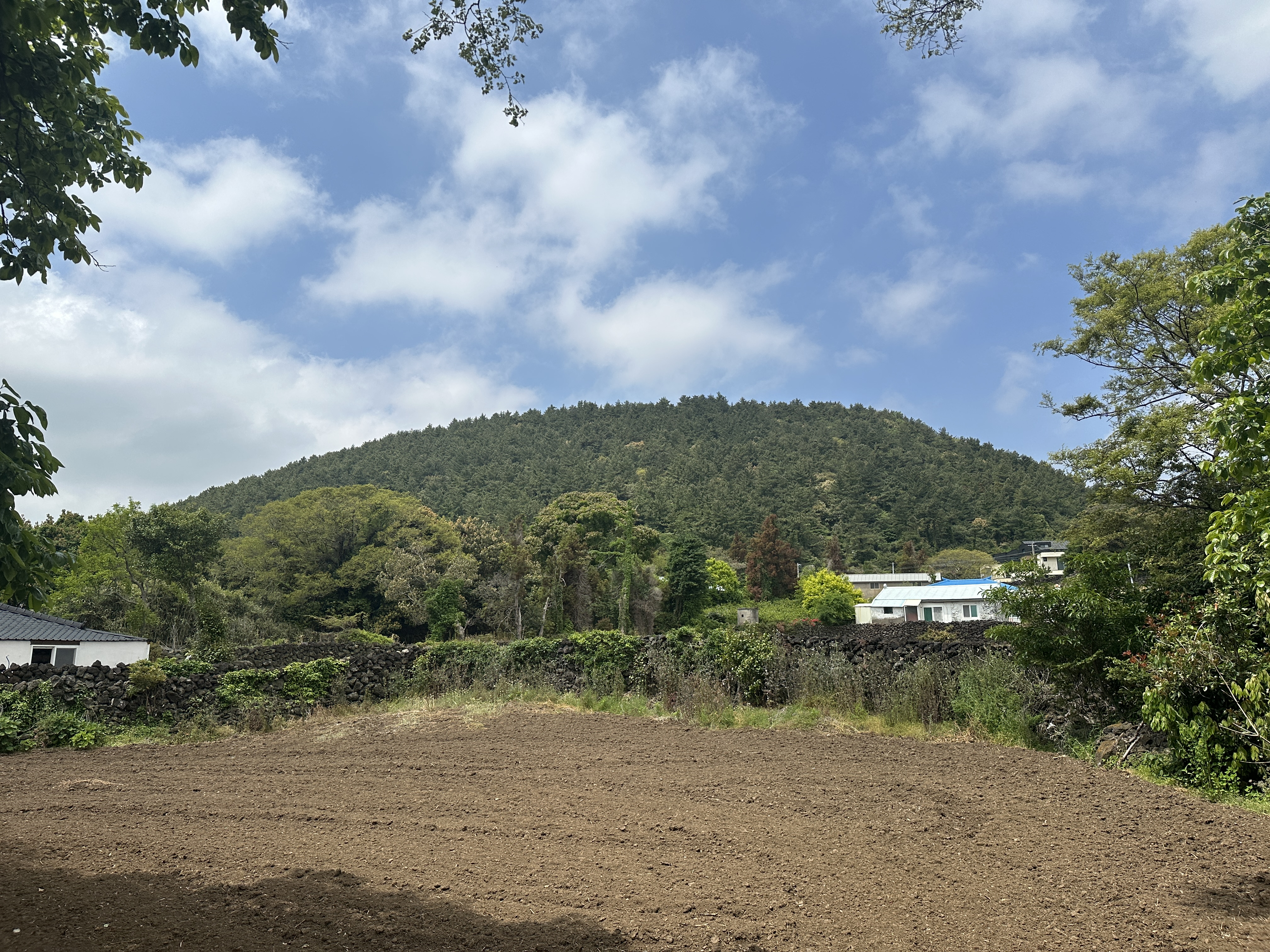
- View from the base (2026)

Highest point
- Coordinates: 33.3312°N 126.2541°E

Geography

Korean name
- Hangul: 저지오름
- Hanja: 楮旨오름
- RR: Jeoji oreum
- MR: Chŏji orŭm

Jeoji Oreum (Korean: 저지오름), also called Sae Oreum (새오름) is an oreum (small extinct volcano) in Jeoji-ri, Hangyeong-myeon, Jeju City, Jeju Province, South Korea. It is 239m tall.

There is a hiking trail up the hill. It takes around 20 minutes to hike the shortest path on the trail. The longest path has a length of 1.6 km. There is a staircase that leads down into the crater of the volcano.

== Gallery ==
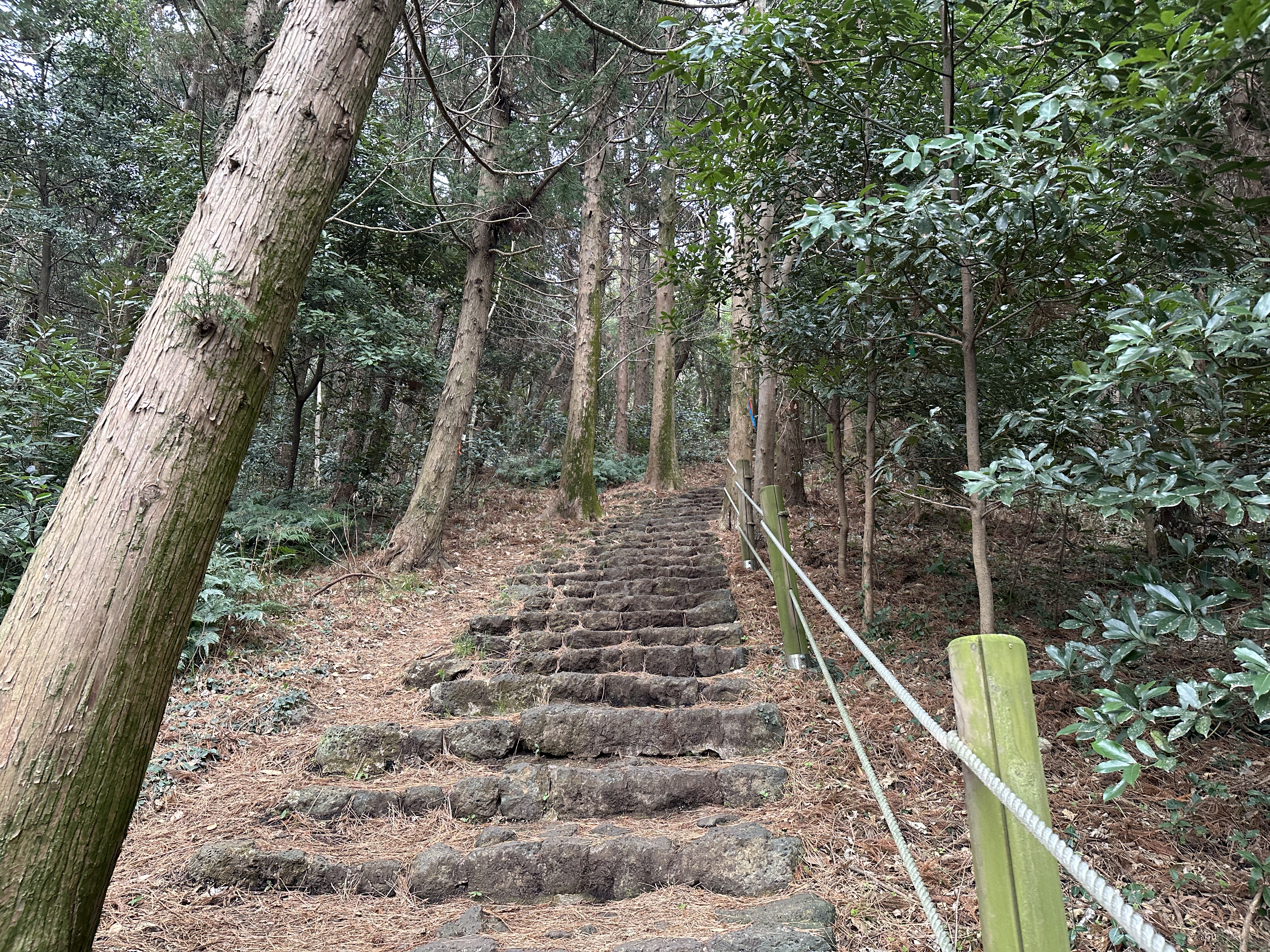
Path up the mountain (2026)

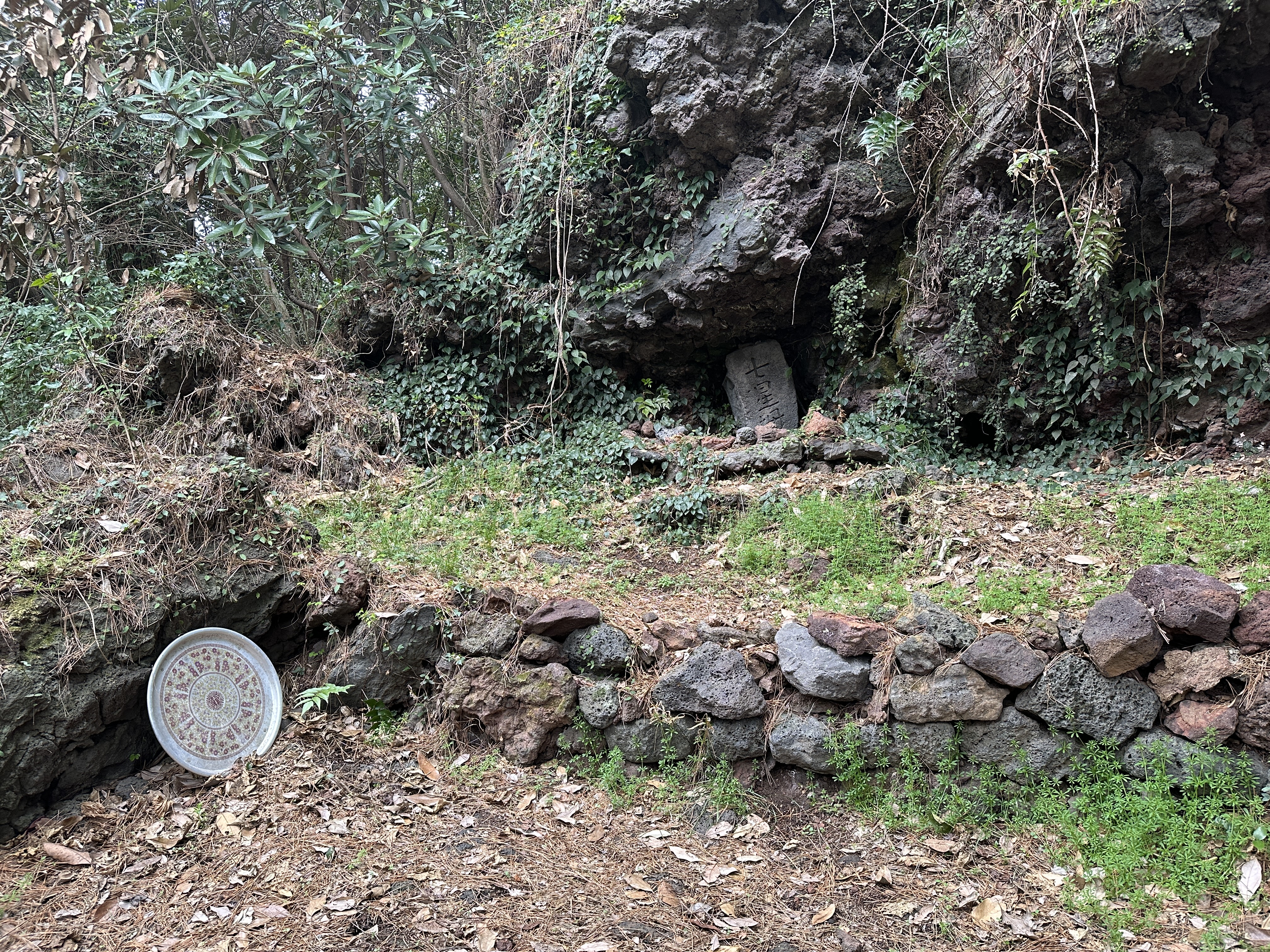
Shrine to the god Chilseongsin (2026)
