= Onyang-eup =

Onyang
- eup
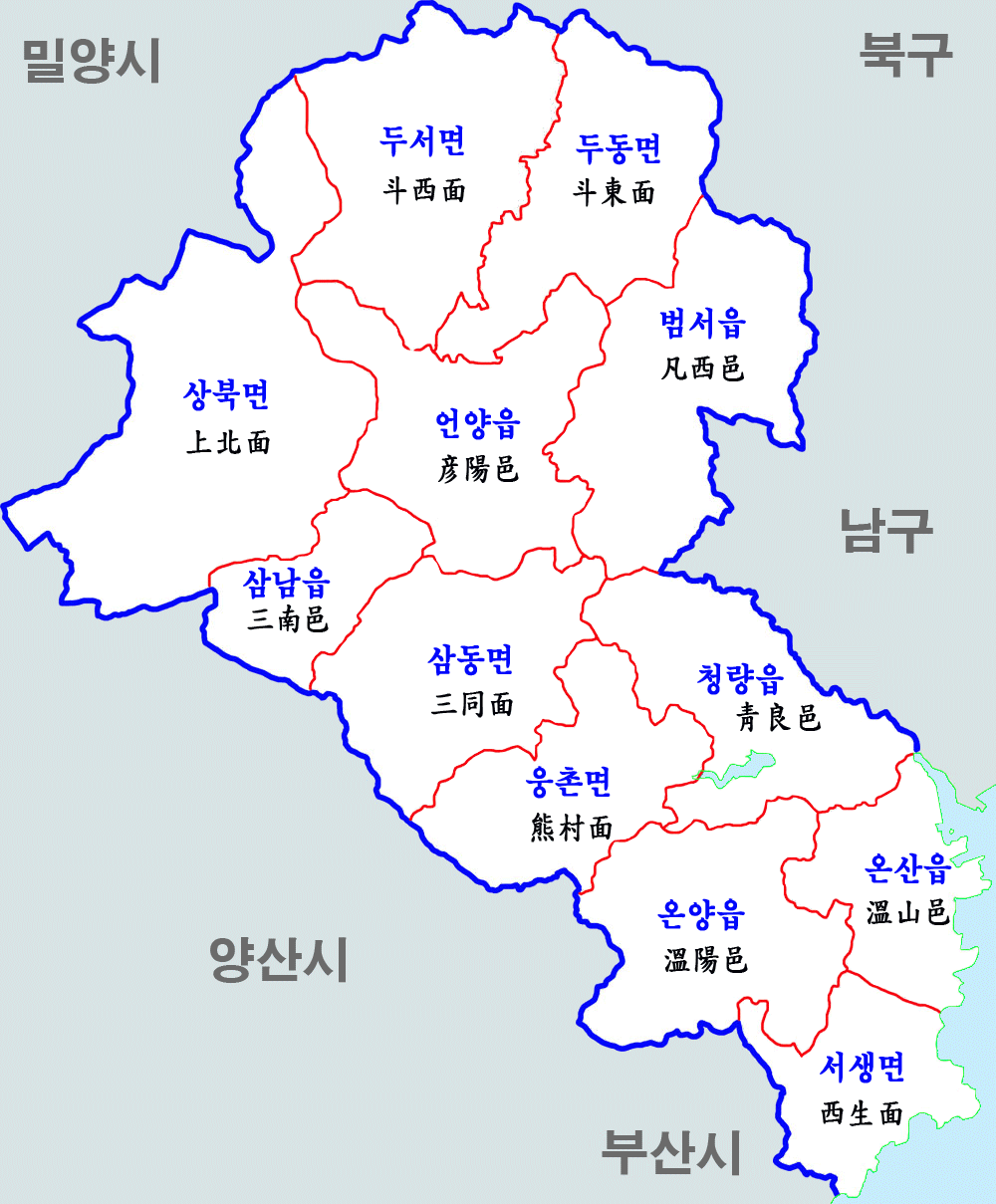
- Map of Ulju County with Onyang eup depicted.

- Location within Ulsan
- Coordinates: 35.4190°N 129.2807°E
- Country: South Korea

Area
  - Total: 63.94 km^{2} (24.69 sq mi)

Population (2012)
  - Total: 24,748
  - Density: 387.1/km^{2} (1,002/sq mi)
- Website: onyang.ulju.ulsan.kr (in Korean)

Korean name
- Hangul: 온양읍
- Hanja: 溫陽邑
- RR: Onyang-eup
- MR: Onyang-ŭp

Onyang (Korean: 온양읍) is an administrative division of Ulju County, Ulsan, South Korea. It is located south of Ulsan city center, east of the Busan-Ulsan expressway.

== Sub-divisions ==
Onyang is divided into 10 sub-divisions, or villages, called ri. These include:

- Bal-ri
- Daean-ri
- Dongsang-ri
- Gosan-ri
- Mangyang-ri
- Naegwang-ri
- Namchang-ri
- Oegwang-ri
- Samgwang-ri
- Unhwa-ri
