= Jakgwaecheon =

Stream in Ulsan, South Korea

Coordinates: 35.550°N 129.102°E

- Hangul: 작괘천
- Hanja: 酌掛川
- RR: Jakgwaecheon
- MR: Chakkwaech'ŏn

Jakgwaecheon is a stream and popular tourist attraction in Ulju County, Ulsan, South Korea. Formed by water erosion, the stream is lined with rocks that have been carved with the names of poetry contest winners. This area is also famous for being the center of the March 1st Movement in Eonyang.

== See also ==
- List of South Korean tourist attractions
