= Chagwido =

Islands in Jeju Province, South Korea

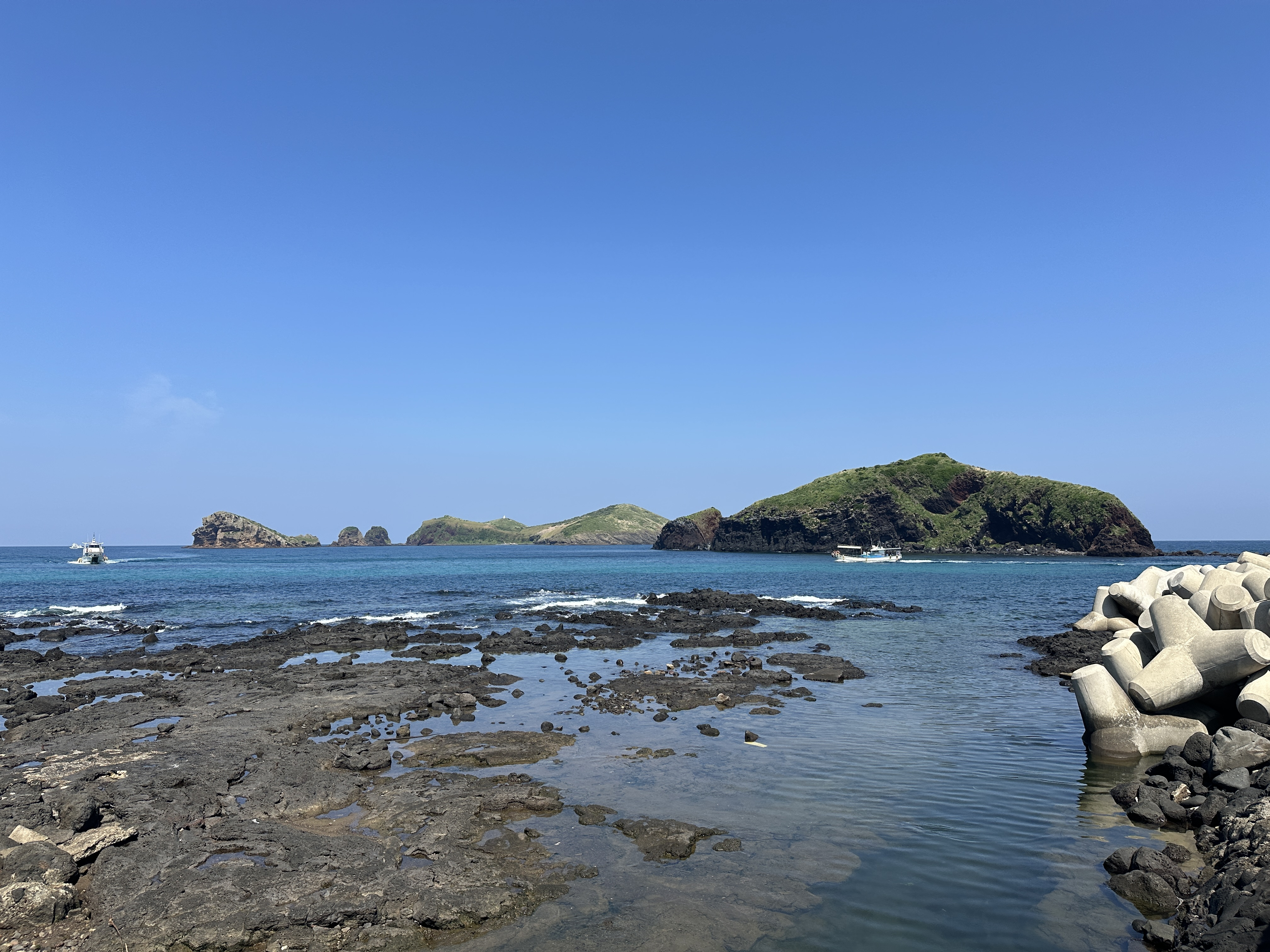
- Wado (left) and Jukdo (right), the islands of Chagwido, as viewed from Jeju Island (2026)
- Interactive map of Chagwido

Geography
- Coordinates: 33°18′55″N 126°9′41″E

Korean name
- Hangul: 차귀도
- Hanja: 遮歸島
- RR: Chagwido
- MR: Ch'agwido

Larger island name
- Hangul: 죽도
- Hanja: 竹島
- RR: Jukdo
- MR: Chukto

Smaller island name
- Hangul: 와도
- RR: Wado
- MR: Wado

Chagwido (Korean: 차귀도) is a set of two islands: the largest island Jukdo (죽도) and the smaller island Wado (와도). They are unpopulated, part of a nature reserve, and located in Gosan-ri, Jeju City, Jeju Province, South Korea. They were designated a Natural Monument of South Korea on July 18, 2000.

Jukdo was inhabited until 1977. Around that time, there were two households on the island. Beginning in 1978, the islands began to be considered uninhabited.

The larger of the two islands is accessible by a brief ferry ride from the Jeju mainland.

== Gallery ==
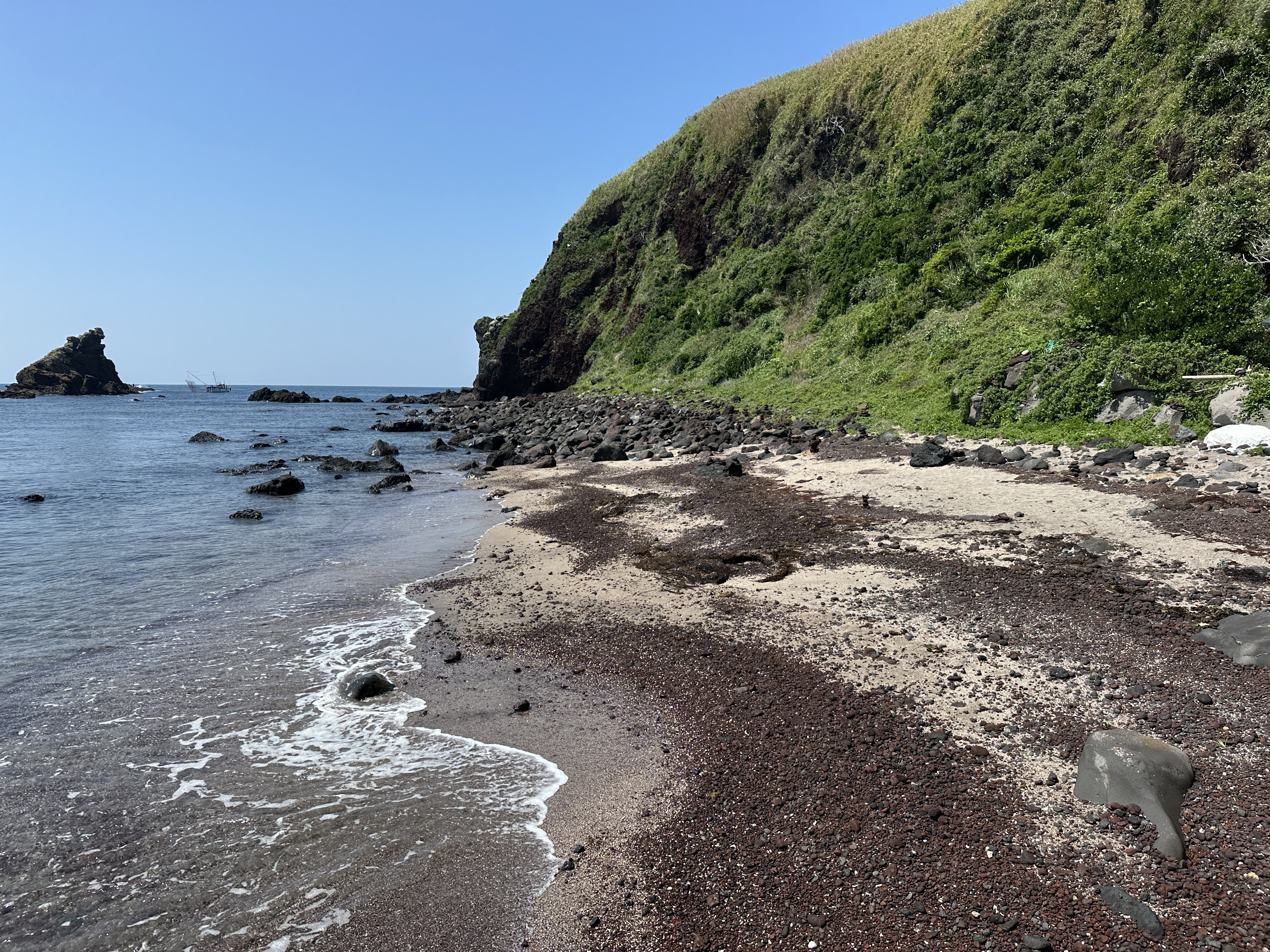
Jukdo's coast (2026)

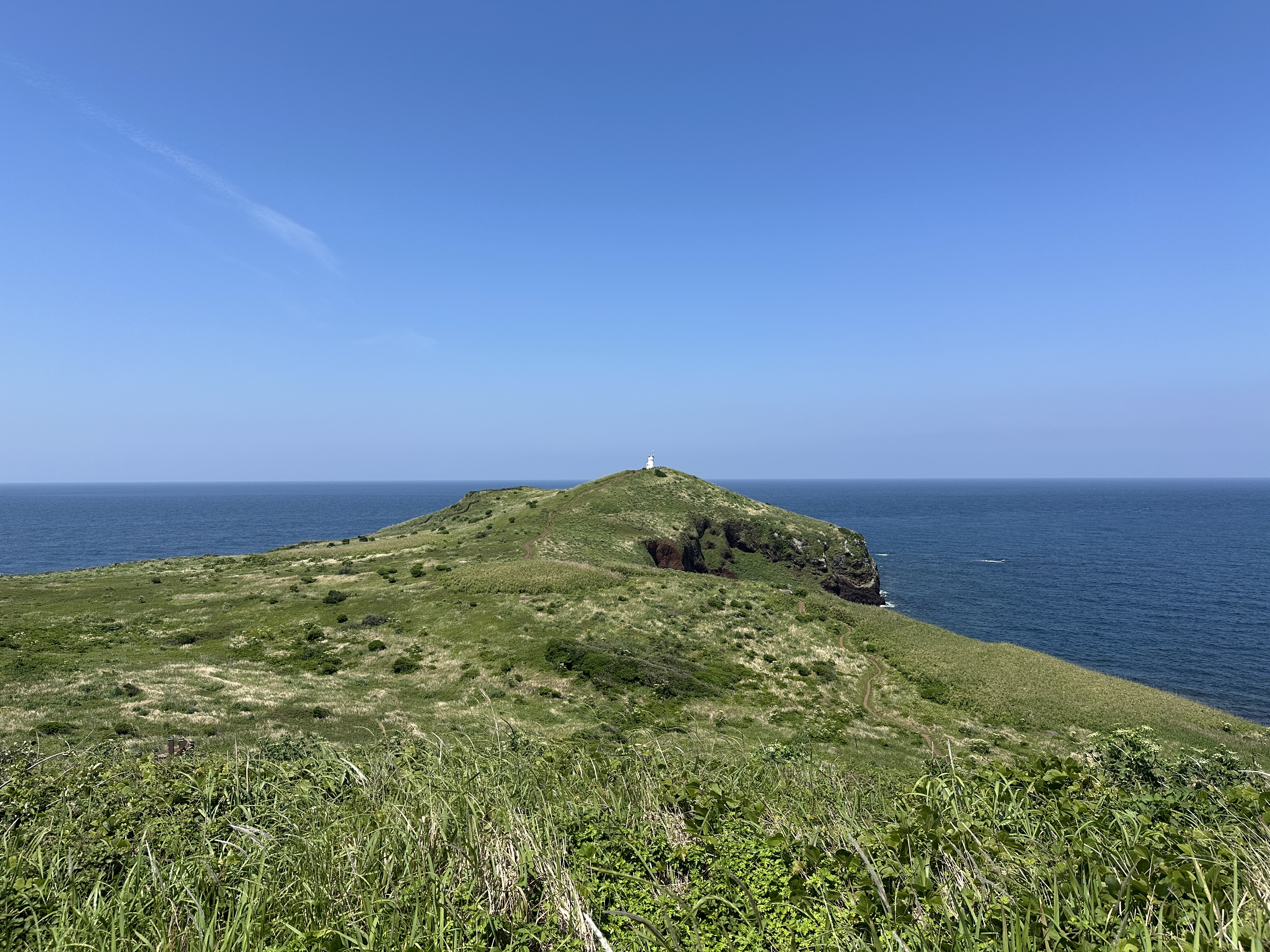
View of the rest of Jukdo from one of its peaks (2026)

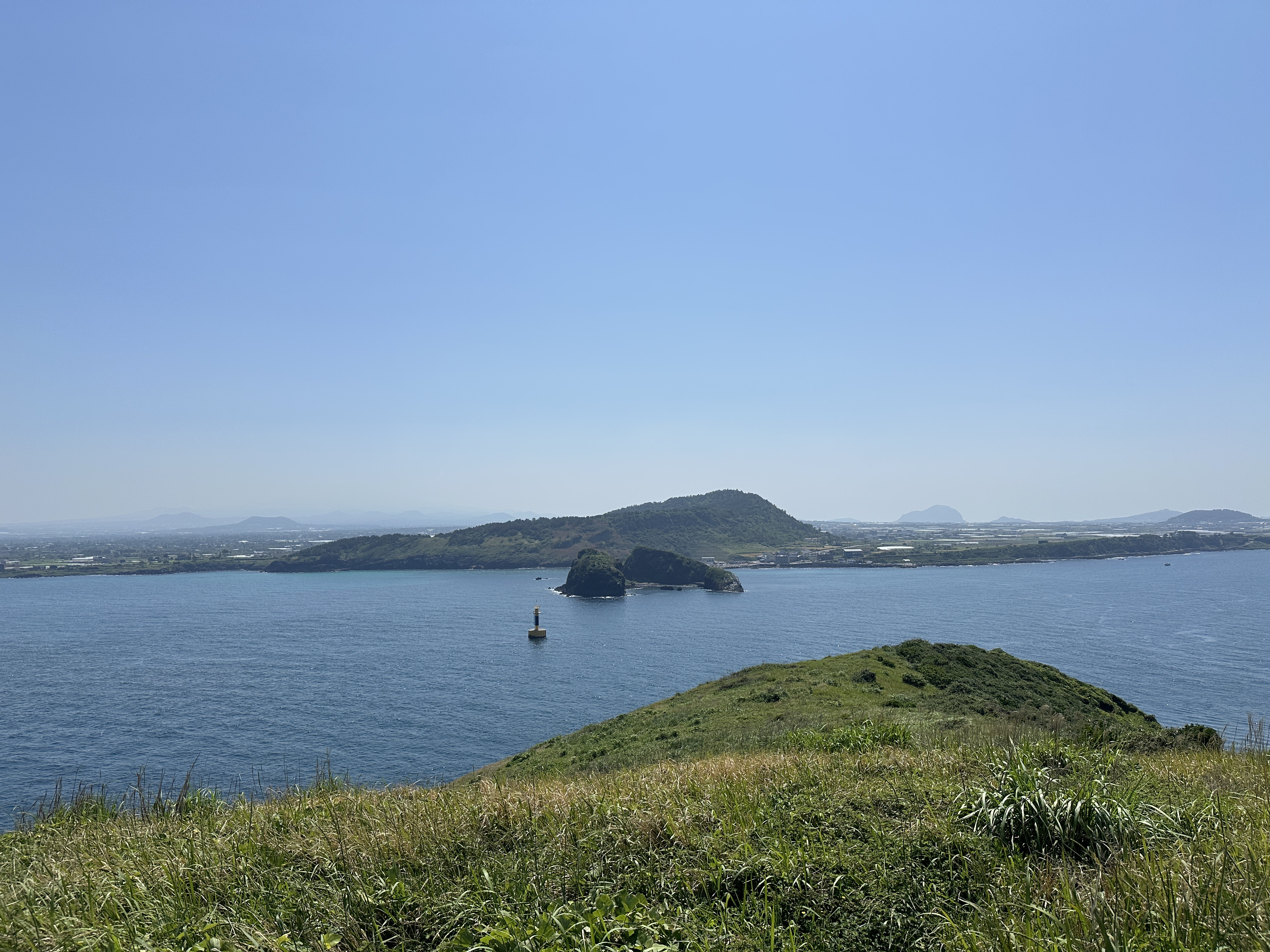
View of Wado from Jukdo (2026)

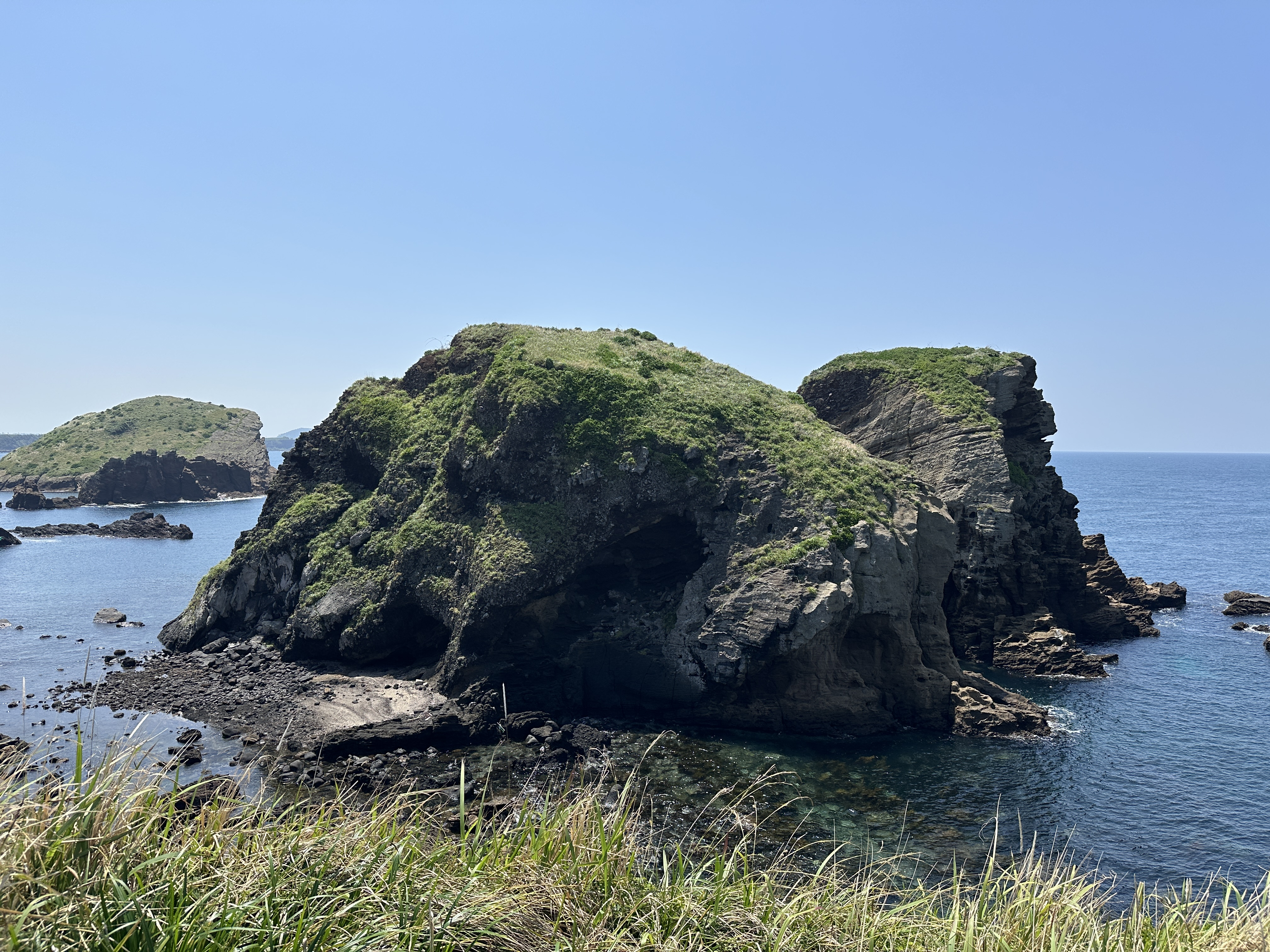
A peak on Jukdo (2026)
