= Dangsanbong =

Hill in Jeju Province, South Korea

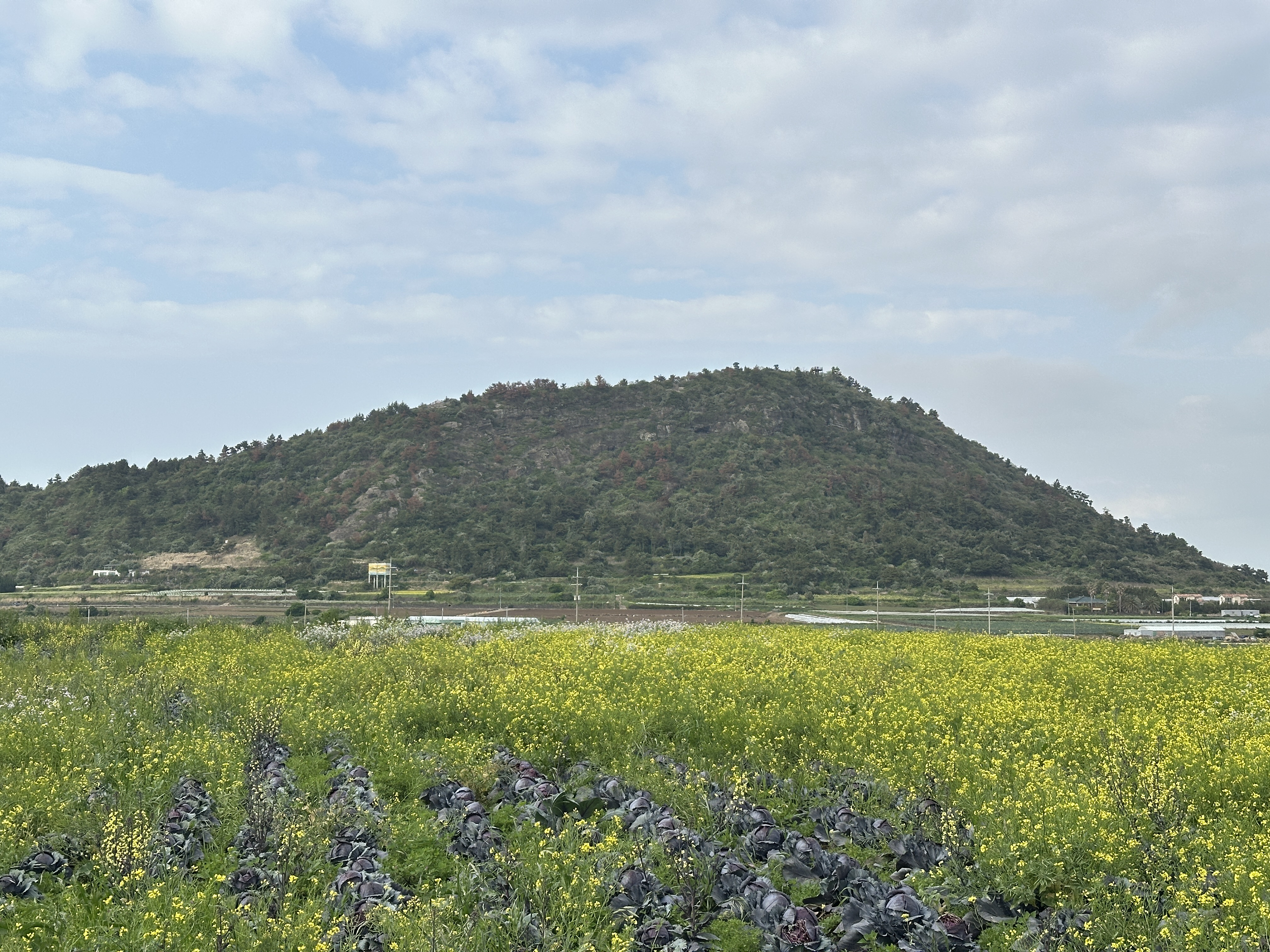
- View from the south (2026)

Highest point
- Coordinates: 33.3076°N 126.1724°E

Geography

Korean name
- Hangul: 당산봉
- Hanja: 堂山峰
- RR: Dangsanbong
- MR: Tangsanbong

Dangsanbong (Korean: 당산봉) is an oreum (small extinct volcano) in Hangyeong-myeon, Jeju City, Jeju Province, South Korea. It has an elevation of 148m, height of 118m, area of 534,135m^{2}, and circumference of 4,674m.

The oreum's name means "shrine mountain"; this is because there once was a shrine at the base of the hill dedicated to a snake god. Other names for the oreum also include Chagwi Oreum (차귀오름) and Chagwiak (차귀악; 遮歸岳).

The oreum is popular for hiking. The trail has been described as fairly easy and short. Part of the Jeju Olle Trail passes over the hill. The summit is considered to have a scenic panoramic view of the surrounding area, including the ocean to the west. As the mountain is in such a westerly position, it is considered good for viewing the sunset.

== Gallery ==
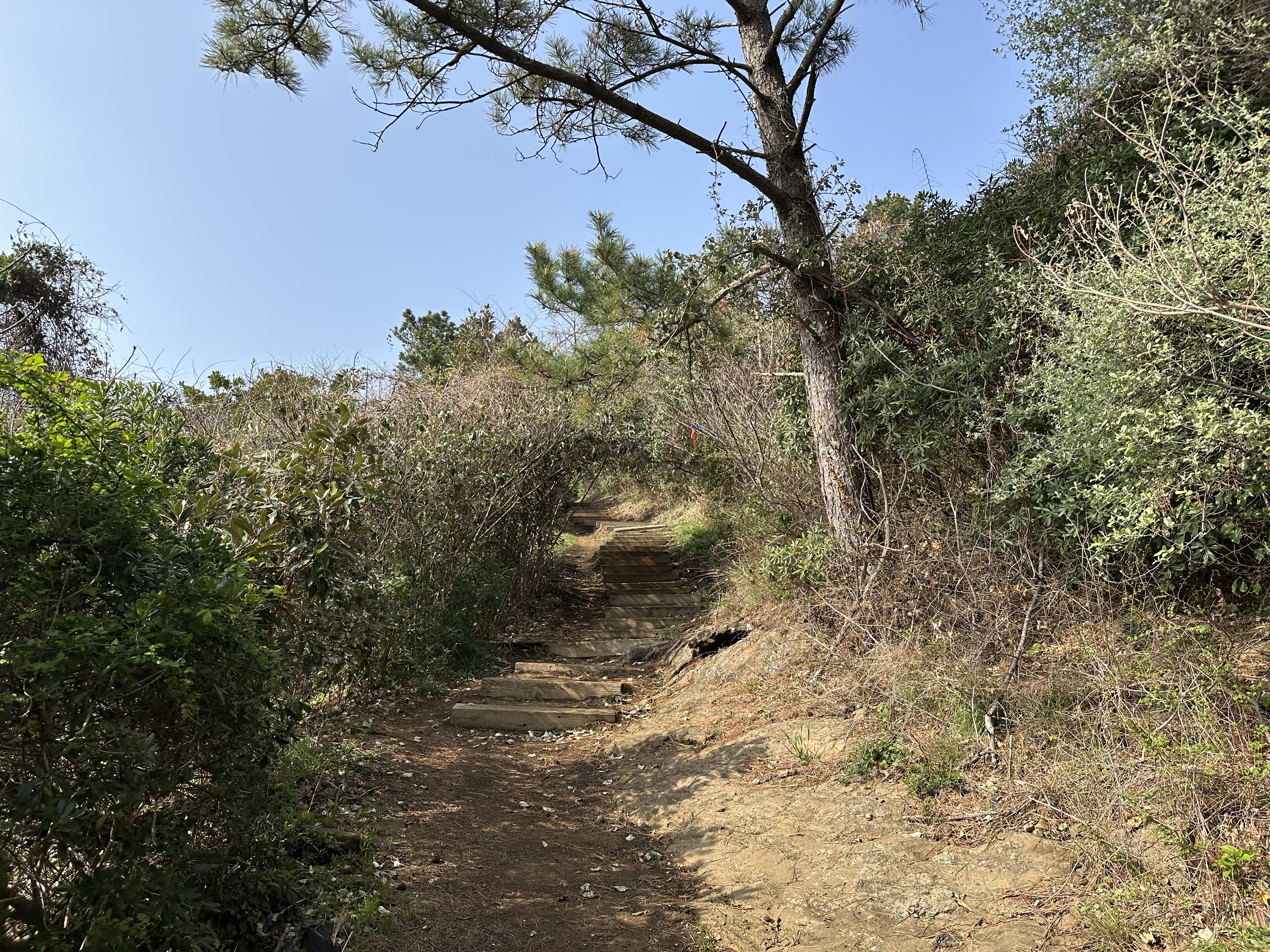
Trail up the mountain (2026)

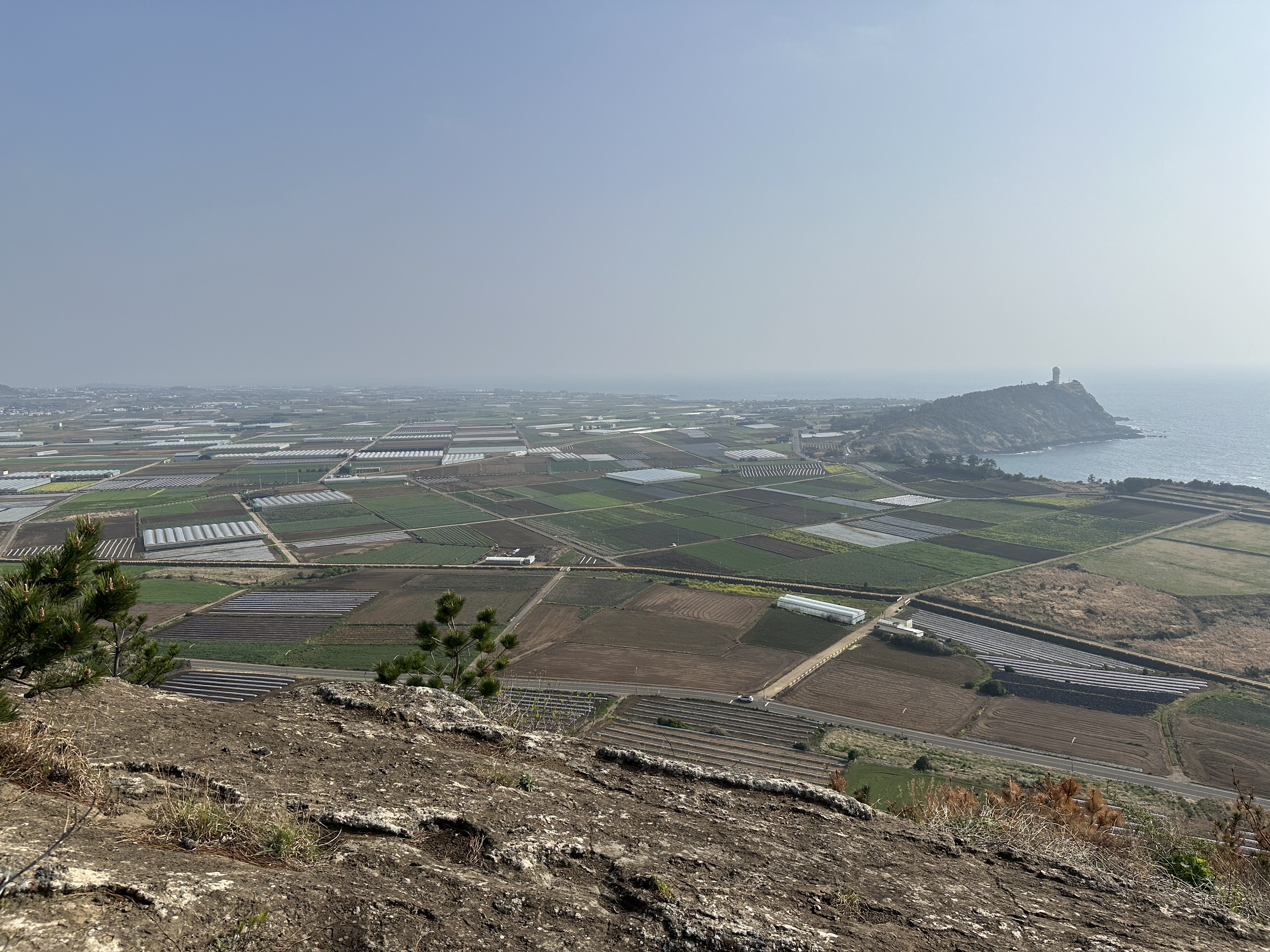
Southwest view from the summit (2026)

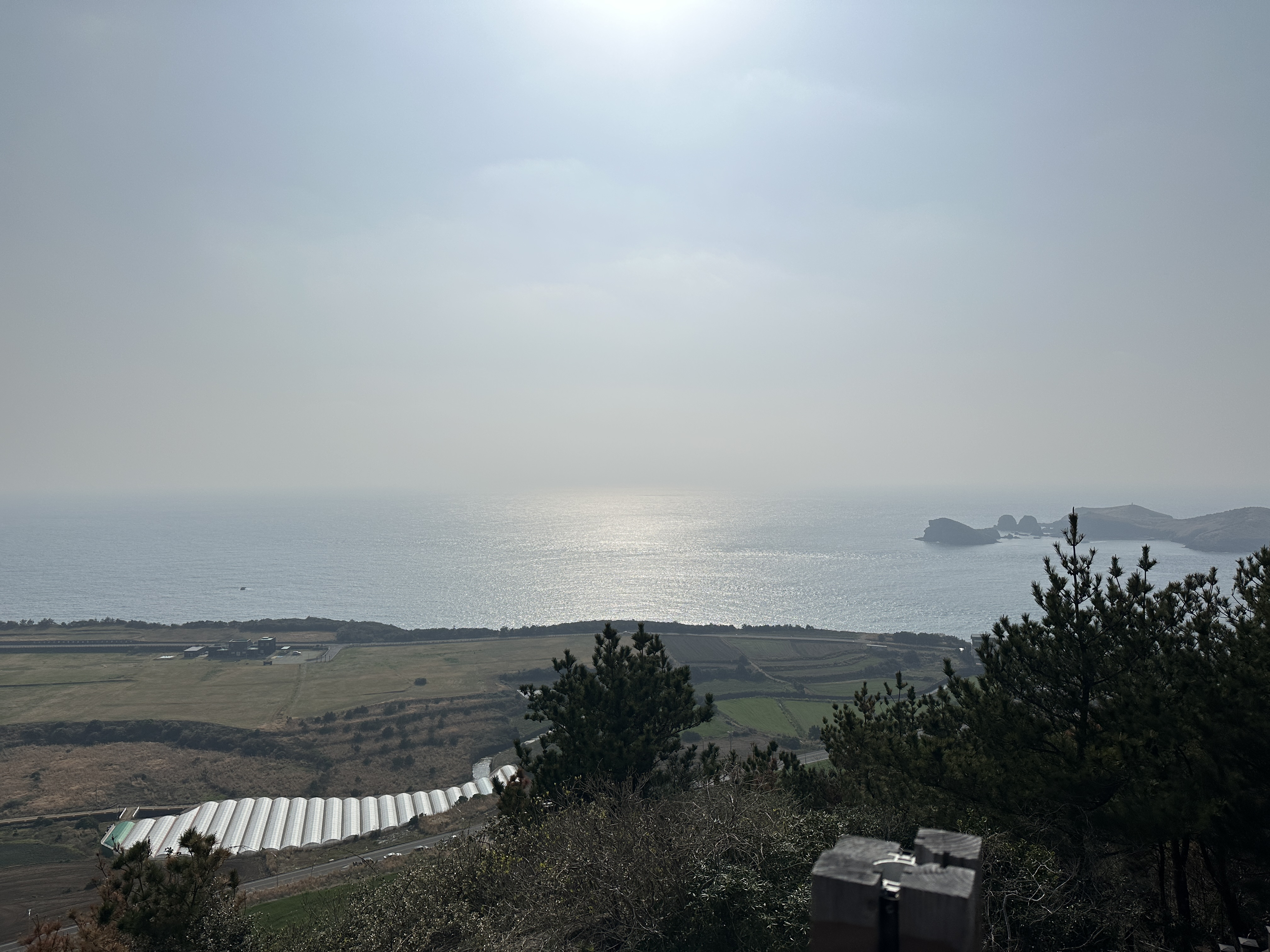
West view from the summit (2026)

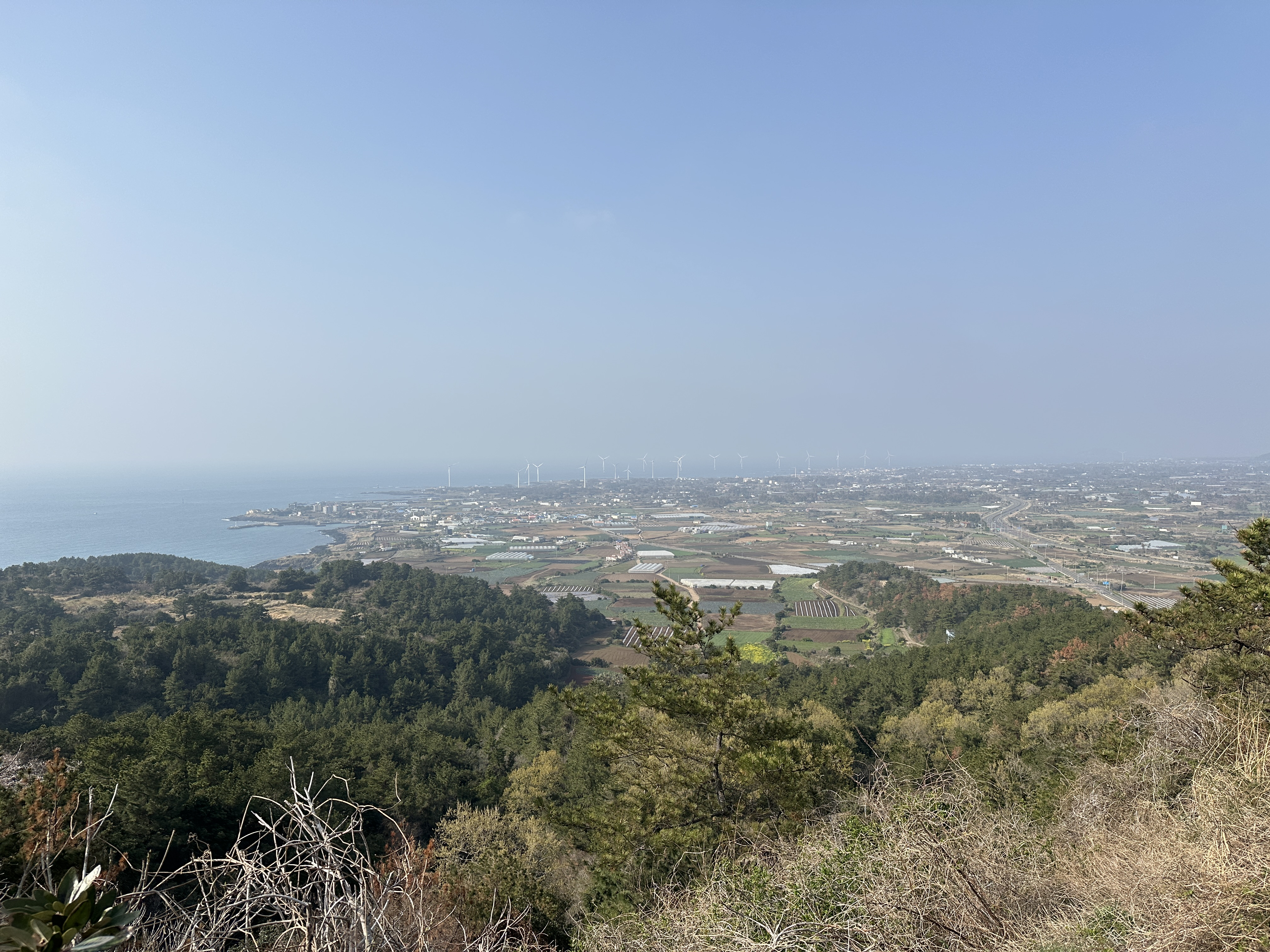
North view from the summit (2026)
