= Namchang-ri =

- Ri (administrative division)
- Location within Ulsan
- Coordinates: 35.4226°N 129.2762°E
- Country: South Korea

Population (2012)
  - Total: 750
- Website: onyang.ulju.ulsan.kr (in Korean)

Korean name
- Hangul: 남창리
- Hanja: 南倉里
- RR: Namchang-ri
- MR: Namch'ang-ri

Namchang-ri (Korean: 남창리) is an administrative division, or village, located in Onyang, Ulju County, Ulsan, South Korea. It is located south of Ulsan city center, east of the Busan-Ulsan expressway.
