= Oegwang-ri =

- Ri (administrative division)
- Location within Ulsan
- Coordinates: 35.4254°N 129.2400°E
- Country: South Korea

Population (2012)
  - Total: 246
- Website: onyang.ulju.ulsan.kr (in Korean)

Korean name
- Hangul: 외광리
- Hanja: 外光里
- RR: Oegwang-ri
- MR: Oegwang-ri

Oegwang-ri (Korean: 외광리) is an administrative division, or village, located in Onyang, Ulju County, Ulsan, South Korea. It is located west of the Busan-Ulsan expressway, just south of Samgwang-ri.
