= Hangyeong =

Town in Jeju City, South Korea

- myeon
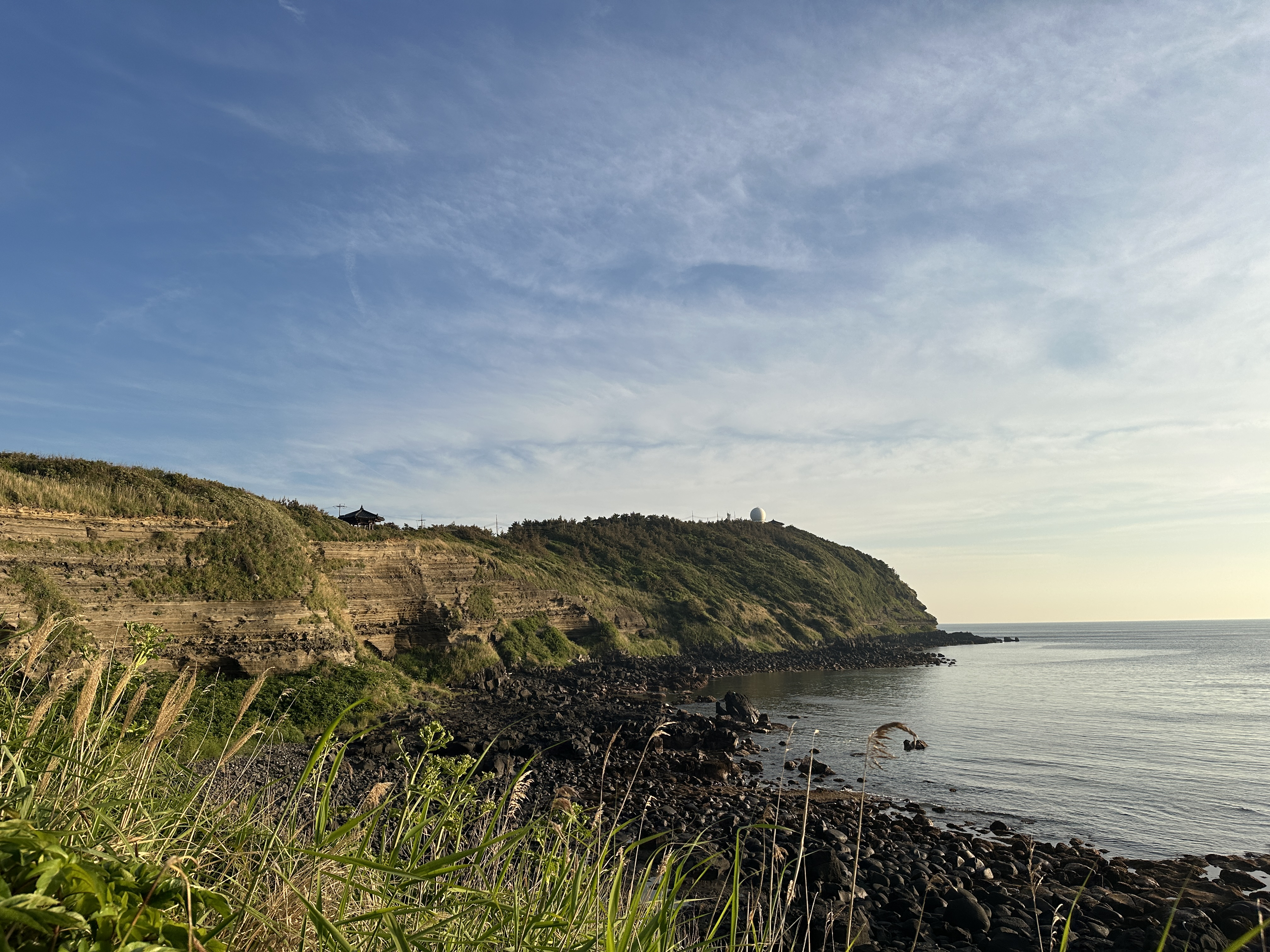
- Suwolbong, a mountain in Hangyeong
- Interactive map of Hangyeong
- Coordinates: 33°19′11.35″N 126°13′2.5″E
- Country: South Korea
- Province: Jeju Province
- City: Jeju City

Area
  - Total: 202.16 km^{2} (78.05 sq mi)
- Languages: Korean, Jeju

Korean name
- Hangul: 한경면
- Hanja: 翰京面
- RR: Hangyeong-myeon
- MR: Han'gyŏng-myŏn

Hangyeong (Korean: 한경) is a myeon in Jeju City, Jeju Province, South Korea.

Hangyeong is located on the northwest of the Jeju Island. It contains the peaks Suwolbong and Dangsanbong. A Hangyeong-myeon was first established on July 8, 1956, when Hallim-myeon was split into Hallim-eup and Hangyeong-myeon. In 2007, Hallim became a part of Jeju City, upon the establishment of Jeju Province.

It celebrated its 70th anniversary in 2026.
