= Ulju County =

Coordinates: 35.54°N 129.20°E

Ulju
- County
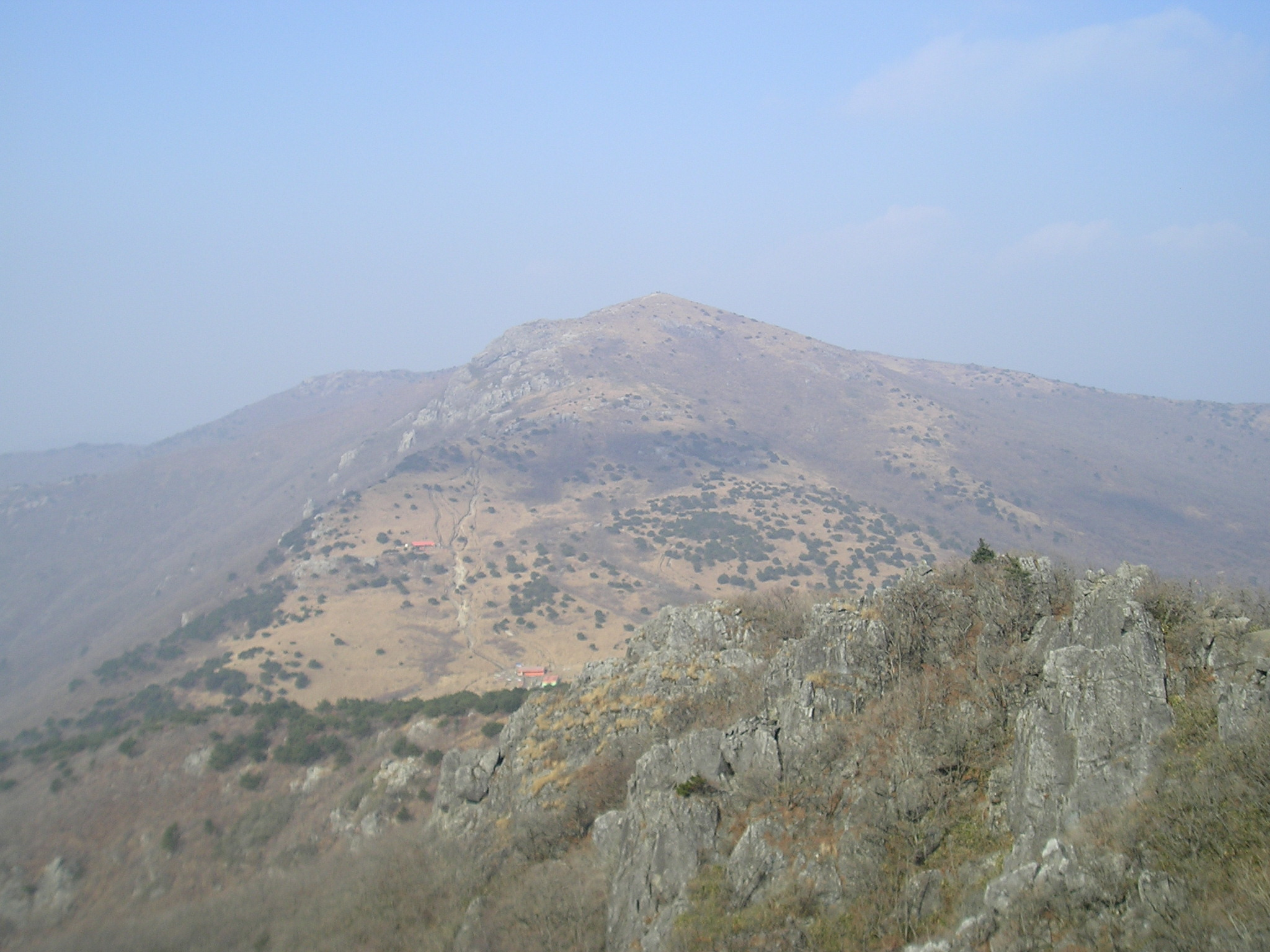
- Chonhwang Mountain

- Flag

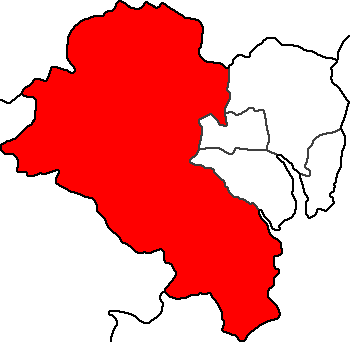
- Country: South Korea
- Region: Yeongnam
- Provincial level: Ulsan
- Administrative divisions: 6 eup, 6 myeon

Area
  - Total: 754.94 km^{2} (291.48 sq mi)

Population (2025)
  - Total: 219,174
  - Density: 288.5/km^{2} (747/sq mi)
  - Dialect: Gyeongsang
- Website: District Office

Korean name
- Hangul: 울주군
- Hanja: 蔚州郡
- RR: Ulju-gun
- MR: Ulchu-gun

Ulju County (Korean: 울주군) is a county occupying much of western Ulsan, South Korea.

== History ==
Many artefacts and historic sites from the prehistoric age show that a settlement of settlers had already been formed in Ulju-gun in the prehistoric age. Jungsan-ri, Nongso-myeon (now Nongso 2-dong, Buk District, Ulsan), Ijeon-ri, Dudong-myeon, Dagae-ri, Eonyang-eup, Samgwang-ri, Onyang-eup, Daedae-ri, Ungchon-myeon, as well as Janghyeon-dong, Ulsan (now Byeongyeong 2-dong, Jung-gu) Hwangbangsan Mountain and the military barracks castle site, Comb-pattern earthenware remains were found. In addition, remains from the Bronze Age, such as ancient tombs in Daun-dong and recently, stone carvings in Cheonjeon-ri, Dudong-myeon and Bangudae Petroglyphs in Daegok-ri, Eonyang-eup, have been discovered. It was called Gulahwachon(屈阿火村) during the Samhan era, and King Pasa of Silla acquired this place and established the subdivision of Gulahwahyeon(屈阿火縣). In 757, (the 16th year of King Gyeongdeok), the name was changed to Hagok(河曲), and it was made into a subdomain of the county of Imgwan-gun, which was in the Mohwa region of Wolseong-gun. According to the geographical section of record『Goryeosa』, "During the reign of King Taejo of Goryeo, due to the great achievements of the villager Park Yun-ung, Hagok-hyeon, Dongjin-hyeon (the area around Gangdong-myeon), Ugchon-myeon and Ungsang-myeon (Yangsan-gun) were Heungnyebu (興禮府) was established by combining Punghyeon."

During the reign of King Seongjong, it was lowered to Gonghwa-hyeon (恭化縣), while its alternative name was changed to Hakseong (鶴城). In 1014 (the 9th year of King Hyeonjong), Gonghwa-hyeon, Heonyang-hyeon, Gijang-hyeon, and Dongnae-hyeon were reorganized into Ulju, and Bangeosa (防禦使) was installed. In 1143 (21st year of King Injong), Heonyang-hyeon was divided and Gammu was established.

In 1397 (Taejo 6 of Joseon), the first camp was established in Ulju, and soldiers were assigned to serve as both byeongmasa and Jijusa, but in 1413 it was merged into one position called jigunsa. In 1426 (the 8th year of King Sejong), the Gyeongsangjwa-do Byeongmajeoldosayeong (兵馬節度使營) in Geomagok (巨磨谷), a barracks-dong in Ulsan, was abolished, and the Byeongmacheomjeoljesa (兵馬僉節制使) represented it, and in 1437 came and rewrote it. And in January of the same year, Ulsan-gun was promoted to Ulsan Protectorate Generalship (蔚山都護府, Ulsandohobu), and then lowered to county again in August.

In 1598 (Seonjo 31), Ulsan was elevated from county to Protectorate Generalship , and the officials of soldiers on the left were assigned to was given the title of the officials of this new subdivision.

In 1895, the local subdivision system was revised, and 23 departments were newly established. At this time, Ulsan-gun came under the jurisdiction of Dongrae-bu, and from May of that year, Ulsan protector genrralship was changed to Ulsan-gun during the reorganization of local government.

During the reorganization of the local government in 1914 and 1915, Eonyang-gun was merged with Ulsan-gun. In 1931, as the existing exemption system was reorganized and the eup-myeon system was newly implemented, Ulsan-myeon was promoted to Ulsan-eup. In 1934, the entire area of Dongmyeon was renamed Bangeojin-eup.

On June 1, 1962, in order to prepare the foundation for industrial city construction, the South Korean government established Ulsan-eup, Bangeojin-eup, Daehyeon-myeon, Hasang-myeon, Duwang-ri of Cheongnyang-myeon (currently Cheongnyang-eup), and Mugeori and Daun of Beomseo-myeon (currently Beomseo-eup), all areas of the industrial district. Ri, Nongso-myeon, Songjeong-ri and Hwabong-ri were combined to create Ulsan City, and the rest of Ulsan-gun was reorganized into Ulju-gun. In addition, for efficient support for the construction of the industrial complex, the Ulsan Special Construction Bureau was established as an agency under the direct control of the Ministry of Construction to accelerate the construction of the industrial complex in Ulsan. In 1991, Ulju-gun was renamed Ulsan-gun, and in 1995, Ulsan-si and Ulsan-gun were integrated to lay the foundation for promotion to a metropolitan city. As Ulsan City was promoted to a metropolitan city on July 15, 1997, Ulju-gu was renamed Ulju-gun (autonomous county), Nongso-eup and Gangdong-myeon were incorporated into Buk-gu, and Ulju-gun was maintained as a system of 2 eup and 10 myeon. In 2001, Onyang-myeon and Beomseo-myeon were elevated to eup status, making them 4 eup and 8 myeon.

== Administrative divisions ==
- Beomseo-eup(범서읍,凡西邑)
- Eonyang-eup(언양읍,彦陽邑)
- Onsan-eup(온산읍,溫山邑)
- Onyang-eup(온양읍,溫陽邑)
- Cheongnyang-eup(청량읍,靑良邑)
- Dudong-myeon(두동면,斗東面)
- Duseo-myeon(두서면,斗西面)
- Samdong-myeon(삼동면,三同面)
- Samnam-eup(삼남읍,三南邑)
- Sangbuk-myeon(상북면,上北面)
- Seosaeng-myeon(서생면,西生面)
- Ungchon-myeon(웅촌면,熊村面)

== Visitor attractions ==
- Ganjeolgot
- Jakgwaecheon

== See also ==
- List of districts in South Korea
- Ganjeolgot
