= Ri (administrative division) =

Administrative division in Korea

- Hangul: 리
- Hanja: 里
- RR: ri
- MR: ri

A ri or village is an administrative unit in both North Korea and South Korea.

== South Korea ==
In South Korea, two different levels of ri exist: "legal ri" (법정리) and "administrative ri" (행정리). One legal ri may be divided into multiple administrative ri; this may occur due to the original legal ri being inconveniently large for purposes of local administration. Alternatively, multiple legal ri may be administered under a single administrative ri. Legal ri are used in assigning land-lot numbers, which were also a key part of addresses prior to the adoption of road name addresses.

Legal ri are comparatively static, while administrative ri may be modified to suit local administrative convenience based on changes in population. Although administrative ri are often named simply by adding a number to the name of the corresponding legal ri, under the Local Autonomy Act a local government can give an administrative ri a completely different name from the corresponding legal ri.

In principle, the divisions among administrative ri are intended to reflect organic distinctions between settlements. However, because they are defined for the purpose of administering those settlements rather than a specific geographic area, the boundaries between administrative ri in uninhabited areas are often not precisely defined.

The distinction between legal and administrative ri in rural areas is analogous to the distinction between legal and administrative dong in urban areas. However, ri are a lower administrative level than dong, occupying the level corresponding to an urban tong. As such, administrative ri are the lowest administrative level in Korean local government.

The representative of the residents of an administrative ri is known as the ijang (이장).

== See also ==
- Administrative divisions of North Korea
- Administrative divisions of South Korea
