= Jeju Olle Trail =

Long-distance footpath in South Korea

- Length: 437 km (272 mi)
- Location: Jeju Island, South Korea
- Established: 2007
- Trailheads: Route 01: Siheung-ri; Route 21: Jongdal Olle
- Use: Hiking
- Difficulty: Easy; medium; high
- Season: All (heat advisory for July and August)
- Months: All (particularly April, May, September, October)
- Sights: Seongsan Ilchulbong, Sanbangsan, Songaksan, Udo, Chujado island, Soesokkak, Daepo Jusangjeolli Cliff, Gapado, Gotjawal forest
- Website: Official website

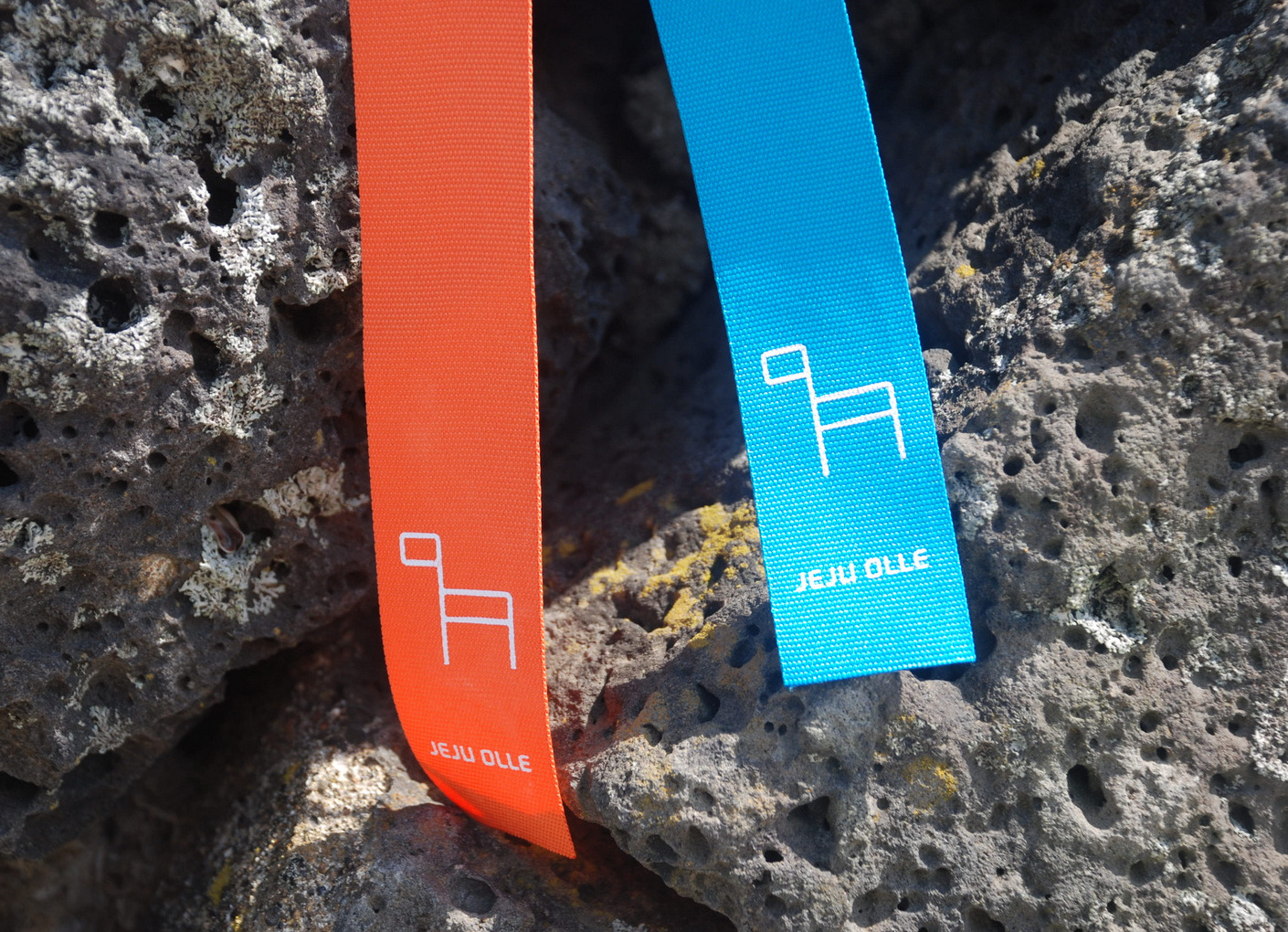
Jeju Olle Trail's orange and blue ribbon waymarkers set against a traditional volcanic stone wall

The Jeju Olle Trail (Korean: 제주올레길) is a long-distance footpath on Jeju Island, in South Korea. It consists of 21 connected numbered main routes, six sub-routes, and a short spur that connects to Jeju International Airport. On average, the routes are 16 km in length and total 437 km. They mainly follow Jeju's coastline and around its outlying islands, passing beaches, fishing villages, indigenous forest, tourist destinations, and urban centers. The exact length and locations change over time as trails are modified or re-routed. Jeju Olle Trail was envisioned and developed by former journalist Suh Myung-sook. It is named after olle, which are short alleys connecting houses to main walkways in traditional Jeju folk architecture.

== History ==
Suh Myung Sook, a native Jeju Islander and former journalist, was inspired by the Camino de Santiago to create a set of hiking trails in Jeju. She established the Jeju Olle Foundation, which developed the trails and periodically plans new routes as well as overseeing trail maintenance.

== Flora and fauna ==
Jeju is a volcanic island that formed approximately 1.2 million years ago in four major eruption events. It comprises four distinct ecosystems: an alpine coniferous forest, a temperate broadleaf forest, a warm temperate evergreen lucidophyll forest, and a temperate grassland.

Hallasan National Park is the prime habitat of Jeju's numerous endangered plant and animals species. Established in 1970, the park features Hallasan, South Korea's highest peak, at 1,950 meters, at its center.

Gotjawal forest is a special ecosystem resulting from ancient volcanic activity. The Jeju-language word gotjawal denotes a rocky, volcanic area covered with trees and vines, where warm-temperature plants from the north and cold-temperature plants from the south coexist. The Jeju Olle Trail, while traversing sections of gotjawal, has set up information centers and awareness programs to minimize the environmental impact of visitors to the area.

== Conservation ==
Jeju Island is part of all four of UNESCO's Internationally Designated Areas. These are the Jeju Volcanic Island and Lava Tubes World Heritage Site, the Jeju Island Biosphere Reserve of the World Network of Biosphere Reserves in Asia and the Pacific, the Jeju Island UNESCO Global Geopark, and two Ramsar wetland sites: 1100 Altitude Wetland and Muljangori-Oreum Wetland. There are also information centers and awareness programs (such as the Clean Olle Program), and docent-led hikes (such as the Walking Mate Program, which is available in English) that are free to the public.

== Local culture ==
The Jeju Olle Trail exposes hikers to a number of Jeju's popular tourist sites and cultural elements.

=== Jeju haenyeo women divers ===
The Jeju Olle Trail mainly runs along or near the coastline. Frequently, orange buoys (known as tewak) can be seen dotting the sea as the haenyeo female divers harvest marine products. They do so without any modern diving equipment, electing instead to use masks, small nets, and their endurance to catch just enough to be sustainable, ensuring that the marine ecosystem remains healthy. They were listed as a UNESCO Intangible Cultural Heritage of Humanity in 2016 and as a South Korean Intangible Cultural Property from 2017 and are considered a symbol of Jeju Island.

=== Jeju language ===
There are a number of words in the Jeju language that have an association with the Jeju Olle Trail, especially objects or locations one encounters on the trail. These include:

- ganse – derived from ganse-dari, or "slow idler". This is the main symbol of the Jeju Olle Trail.
- gotjawal – an old-growth forest of trees and vines that grow in volcanic rocky areas. Some of the Olle trails run through gotjawal.
- Halmang – grandmother, or the goddess in Jeju's foundation myth
- gwangchigi – a broad and flat rock
- hanon – large plantation and the crater that provides water for an area
- deok – a large, tall rock along the coast
- altteureu – a vast plain
- golchengyi – a shallow ditch at the side of a road
- naetgolchaengi – water flowing through ditches that eventually empties into the ocean
- baeyeom – snake
- jimi – land's end

== Routes ==
A total of 27 trails comprise the Jeju Olle Trail, six of which are sub-routes, for a total of 437 km.

=== Route 01 to Route 10-1 ===
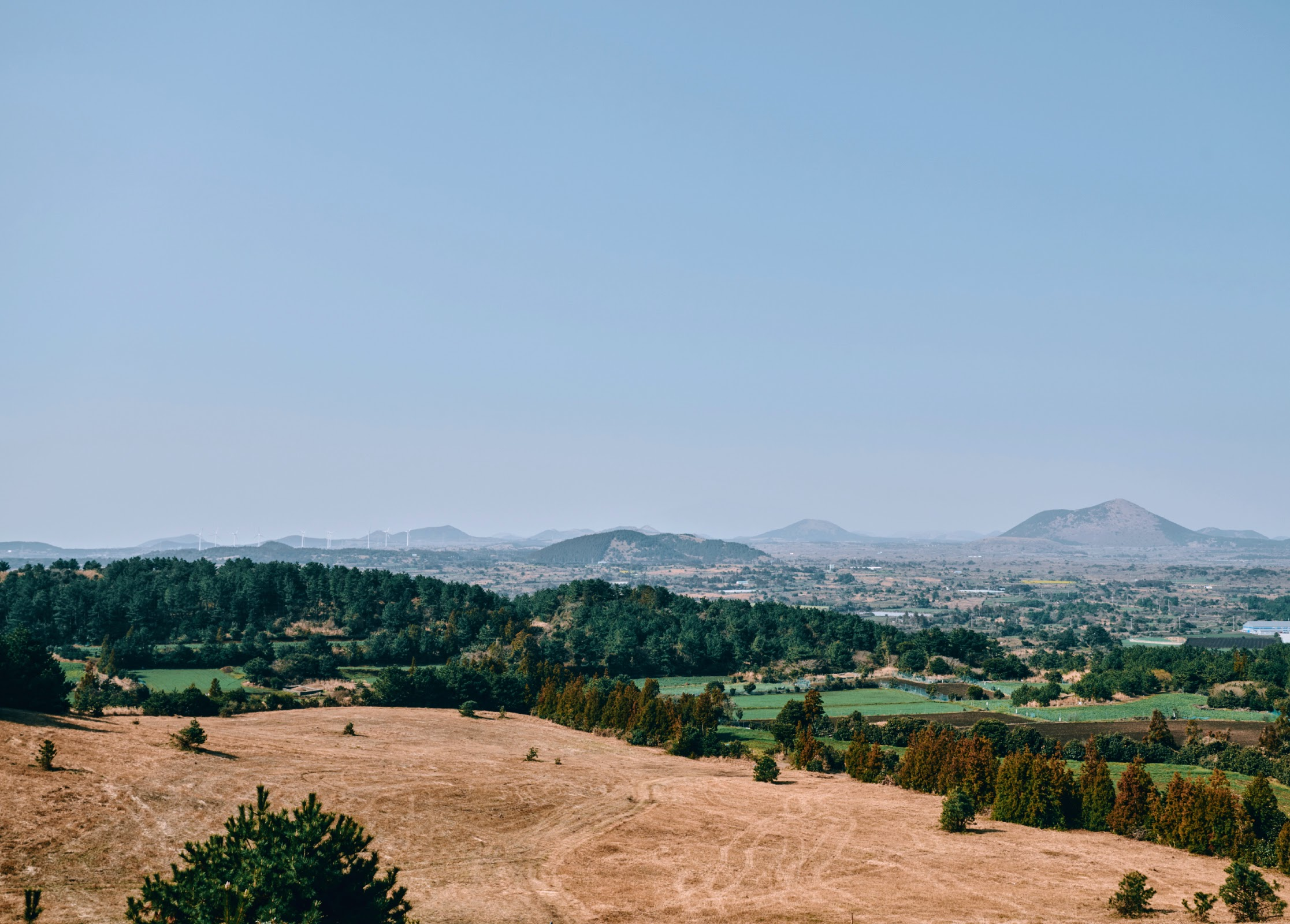
Volcanic cones (oreum), as seen from Route 01

Route 01: Siheung – Gwangchigi Olle (시흥-광치기 올레)

Total distance: 15.1 km; total time: 4–5 hours; difficulty: medium

Jeju Olle's first route connects the island's volcanic cones (known as oreum) to the ocean. The route starts near Siheung Elementary School and passes through an evergreen field, Malmi Oreum, and Al Oreum, with a panoramic view of Seongsan Ilchulbong's peak and Udo. Its "friendship trail" is the Camino de Santiago in Spain.

Route 1-1: Udo Island Olle (우도-올레)

Total distance: 13.1 km; total time: 4–5 hours; difficulty: medium

Udo, the second-largest island in Jeju Province, is named after its shape, which resembles a reclining cow. It offers a trail with scenic views of the ocean and landscapes, including seaside walks, farm roads, and fields of rye, barley, and peanuts. Getting to Route 1-1 takes 15 minutes by ferry from the Seongsan port.

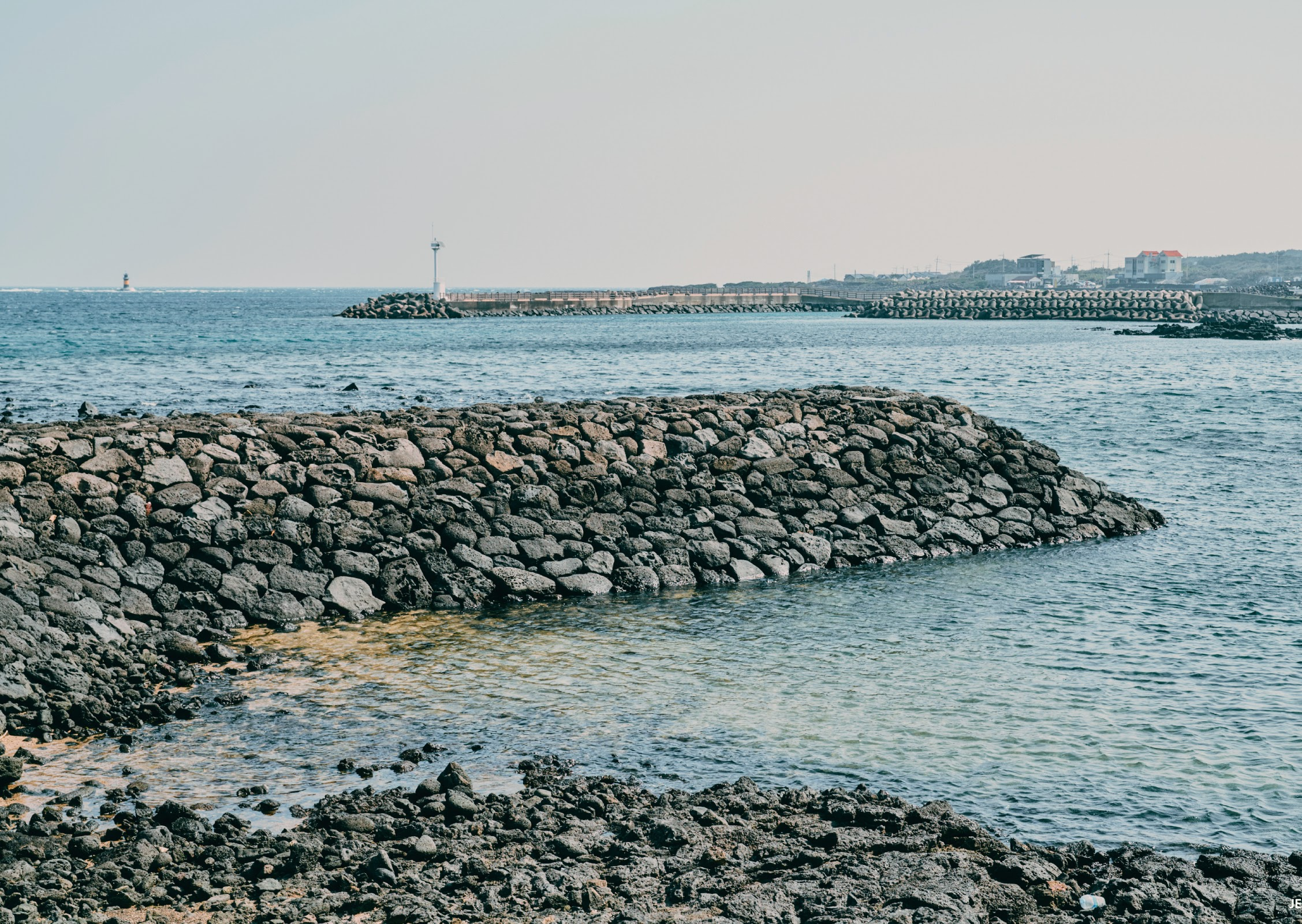
View of the coastline along Route 02

Route 02: Gwangchigi – Onpyeong Olle (광치기-온평 올레)

Total distance: 15.6 km; total time: 4–5 hours; difficulty: medium

Route 02 begins at Gwangchigi Beach, passes peaks and ponds, and ends at a small beach. The peak of Daesusanbong has views of Jeju. The route passes a pond with mythological significance. Its friendship trail is the Bruce Trail in Canada.

Route 03: Onpyeong – Pyoseon Olle (온평-표선 올레)

Total distance: (A) 20.9 km (B) 14.6 km; total time: (A) 6–7 hours (B) 4–5 hours; difficulty: (A) high (B) easy

This is an inland route (A) and ocean trail (B) with old stone walls and wild shrubs. Route 03 goes by Tong Oreum and Dokjabong. Walking paths in Samdal-ri lead to the Kim Young-gap Gallery Dumoak. Its friendship trail is Cotswold Way in England.

Route 04: Pyoseon – Namwon Olle (표선-남원 올레)

Total distance: 19 km; total time: 5–6 hours; difficulty: medium

This coastal route starts at the beach, crosses the Ganeungae, and reaches Sehwa-ri, a fishing village once called Gama-ri. The Gamari Haenyeo Olle is where Jeju haenyeo diving women used to go to the ocean. Jeju Olle rebuilt the forest path here after 35 years, with help from the ROK Marine Corps, so it is also known as the Marine Trail.

Route 05: Namwon – Soesokkak Olle (남원-쇠소깍 올레)

Total distance: 13.4 km; total time: 4–5 hours; difficulty: medium

Route 05 includes the Keun-ung (hill) walkway, the Soesokkak estuary, and camellia trees in Wimi-ri village. It ends at Soesokkak pond, where a freshwater stream meets the sea.

Route 06: Soesokkak – Jeju Olle tourist center (쇠소깍-제주올레 여행자센터 올레)

Total distance: 11 km: total time: 3–4 hours; difficulty: easy

Route 06 starts at Soesokkak-dari (bridge) and goes through downtown Seogwipo. It continues to a Jeju Olle tourist center and passes landmarks like the Seogwipo KAL Hotel and Lee Joong-seop Cultural Street. Its friendship trail is the Zermatt 5-Lake Trail in Switzerland.

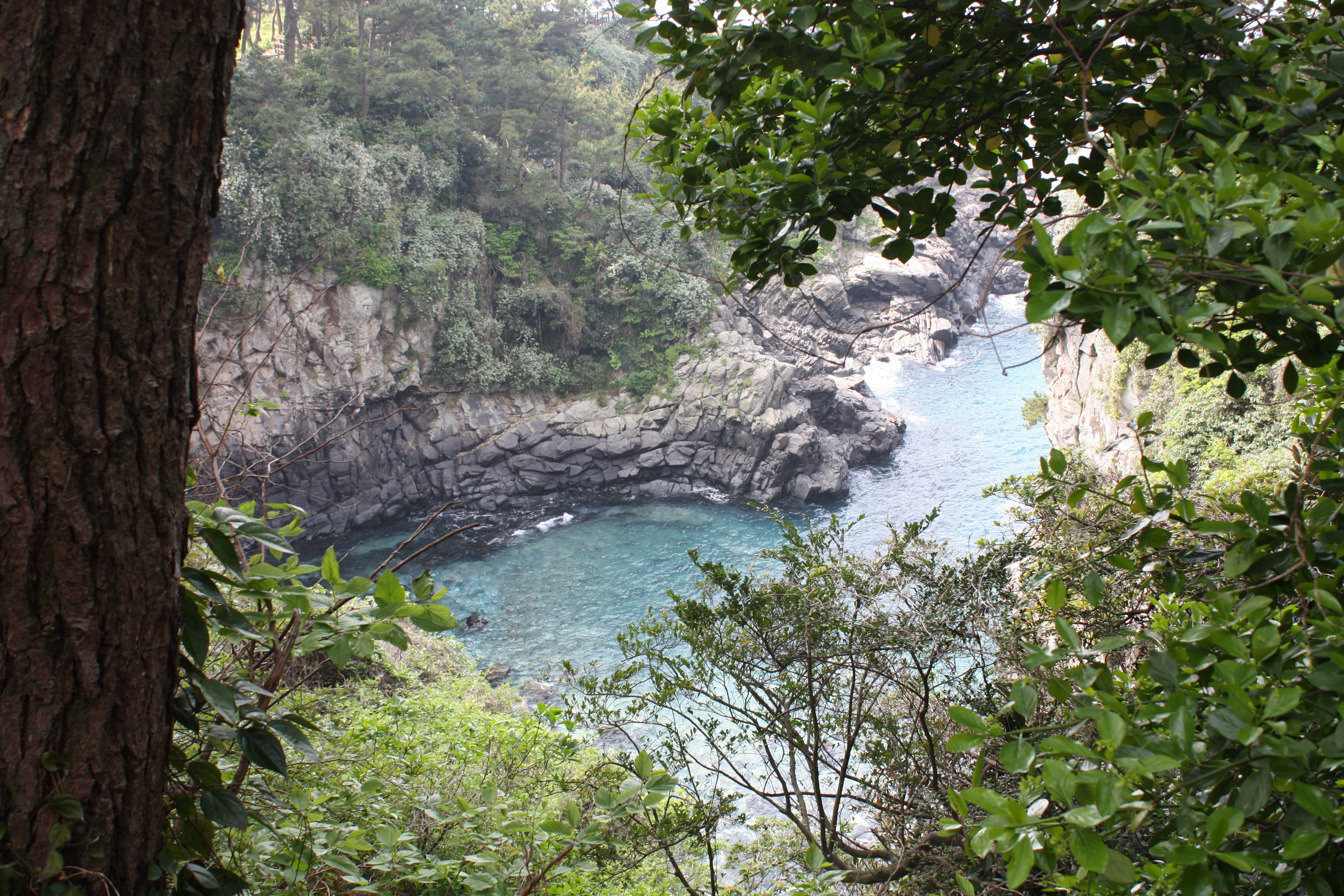
Walkers can see the Gangjeong stream as they walk along Route 07.

Route 07: Jeju Olle tourist center – Wolpyeong Olle (제주올레 여행자센터-월평 올레)

Total distance: 17.6 km; total time: 5–6 hours; difficulty: medium

Route 07 is a coastal trail from a Jeju Olle tourist center to Wolpyeong, passing by a ten-meter-tall sea stack called Oedolgae and the Subong-ro ecology trail.

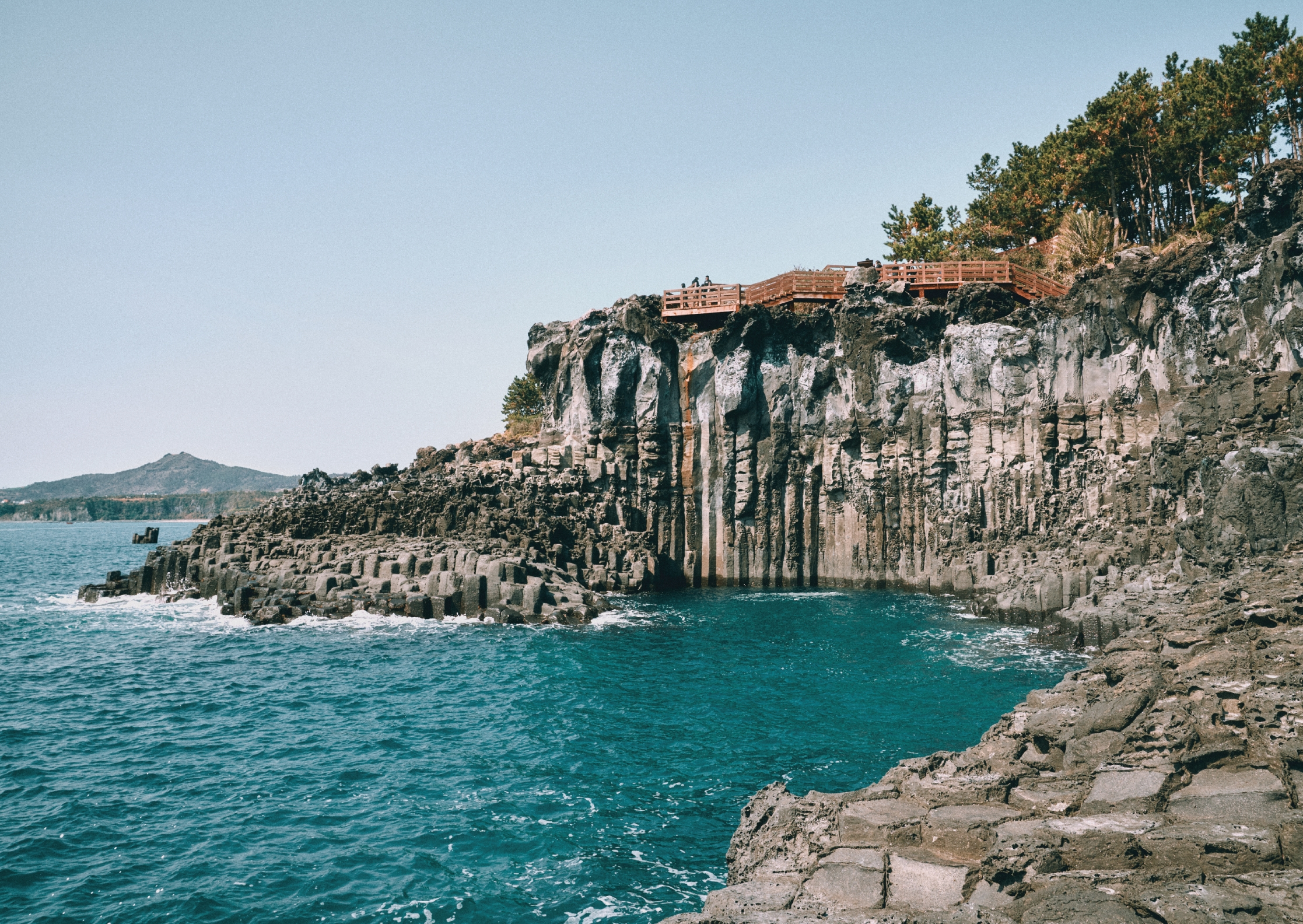
Daepo Jusangjeolli Cliff, as seen from Route 08 in Jungmun, Seogwipo-si

Route 7-1: Seogwipo Bus Terminal – Jeju Olle tourist center Olle (서귀포 버스터미널 – 제주올레 여행자센터 올레)

Total distance: 15.7 km; total time: 4–5 hours; difficulty: medium

Route 7-1 starts at the Seogwipo bus terminal, passes through mountains, and ends at a Jeju Olle tourist center. Hallasan mountain dominates the north, while the southern sea and Seogwipo stretch out to the south. The mid-mountain area features cliffs and warm–temperate forests.

Route 08: Wolpyeong – Daepyeong Olle (월평-대평 올레)

Total distance: 19.6 km; total time: 5–6 hours; difficulty: medium

Route 08 includes the hexagonal basalt columns of Jusangjeolli, Yerae Ecological Park, and Daepyeong-ri village, where the ocean meets the ridge of Andeok Valley. There is a panoramic view of the region from the top of Gunsan mountain. Jungmun Saekdal Beach and Cheonjeyeon Waterfalls are also in the area.

Route 09: Daepyeong – Hwasun Olle (대평-화순 올레)

Total distance: 11.8 km; total time: 3–4 hours; difficulty: high

Route 09 begins at Daepyeong-pogu port, passes by the Moljil horse path, and continues to Gunsan mountain and its scenic views. The route ends at Andeok Valley, a natural monument with a lush forest, stream, and caves. Its friendship trail is the Lebanon Mountain Trail.

Route 10: Hwasun – Moseulpo Olle (화순-모슬포 올레)

Total distance: 15.6 km; total time: 5–6 hours; difficulty: medium

Route 10 runs from Hwasun Golden Sand Beach to Hamo-ri village and passes by several beaches and mountains, including Songaksan. It offers views of Sanbangsan mountain and the islands of Marado and Gapado. Its friendship trail is Leman Lake Wine Route in Switzerland.

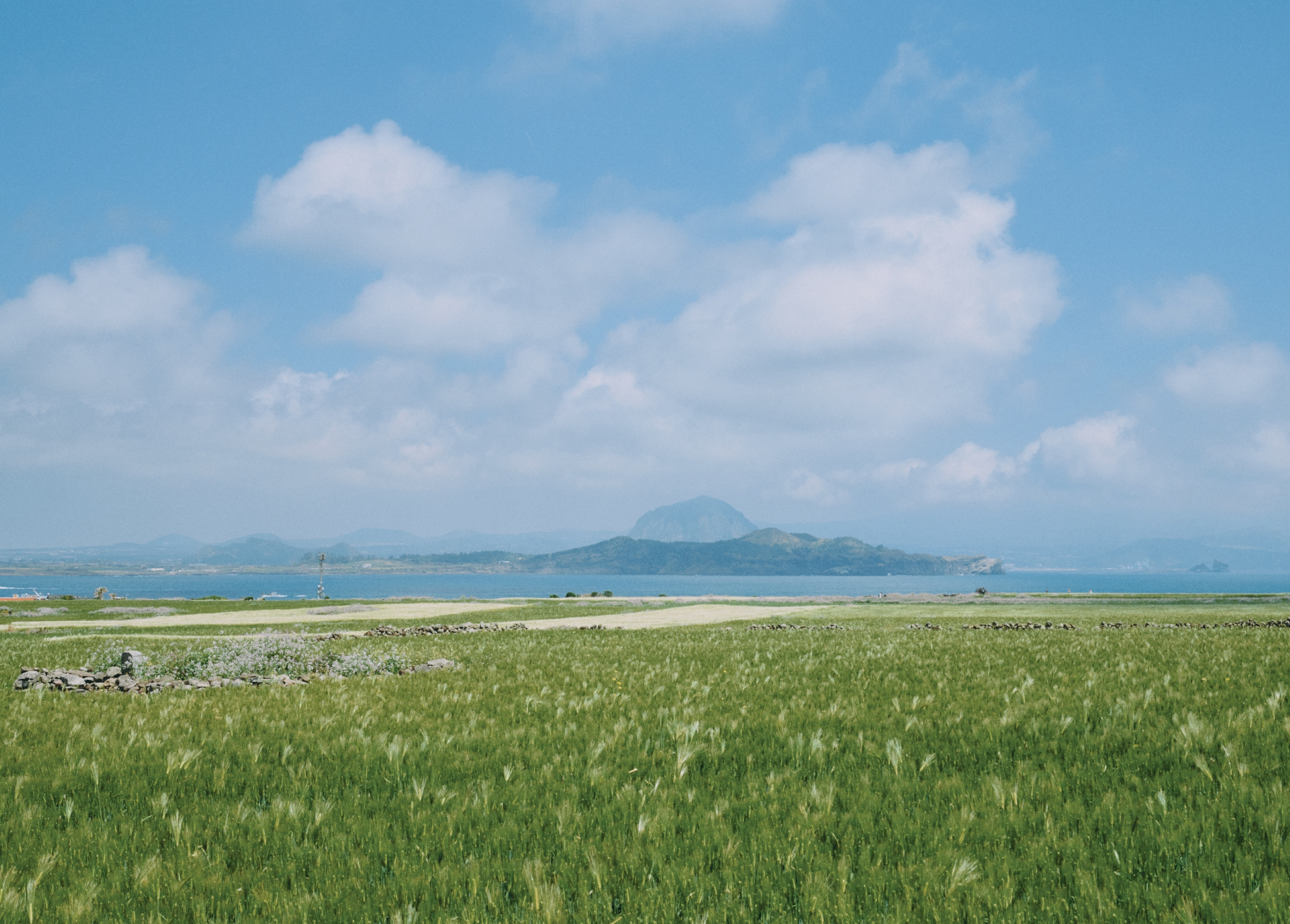
View of Sanbangsan from Gapado Island and Route 10-1

Route 10-1: Gapado Island Olle (가파도 올레)

Total distance: 4.2 km; total time: 1–2 hours; difficulty: easy

Jeju Island has South Korea's highest mountain—Hallasan, at 1,950 m—and its lowest-lying inhabited island, Gapado. Of all the sections of the Jeju Olle Trail, Gapado is known to be the easiest, since it is almost completely flat. It can be completed in two hours at a leisurely pace. A short ferry ride from Moseulpo Port is required.

=== Route 11 to Route 21 ===
Route 11: Moseulpo – Mureung Olle (모슬포-무릉 올레)

Total distance: 17.3 km; total time: 5–6 hours; difficulty: medium

Route 11 follows an ancient path restored by the Jeju Olle Foundation and offers views of the southwest Jeju region, including the gotjawal forest. Its friendship trail is the Lycian Way in Turkey.

Route 12: Mureung – Yongsu Olle (무릉-용수 올레)

Total distance: 17.5 km; total time: 5–6 hours; difficulty: medium

Route 12 is the first trail that joins Seogwipo to Jeju City. It has views of working fields, the ocean, Suwolbong peak, Dowon pond, and Noknambong peak, as well as the uninhabited and environmentally protected Chagwido islands.

Route 13: Yongsu – Jeoji Olle (용수 – 저지 올레)

Total distance: 16.2 km; total time: 4–5 hours; difficulty: medium

Route 13 turns inland and goes through a woodland path. It passes through Yongsu-pogu port, the Yongsu Jeosuji reservoir, and Nakcheon-ri village, before continuing through forests and past volcanic cones. Approximately 3 km of the trail was restored with the help of the 13th Special Air Force Brigade. Its friendship trail is the Shikoku Ohenro in Japan.

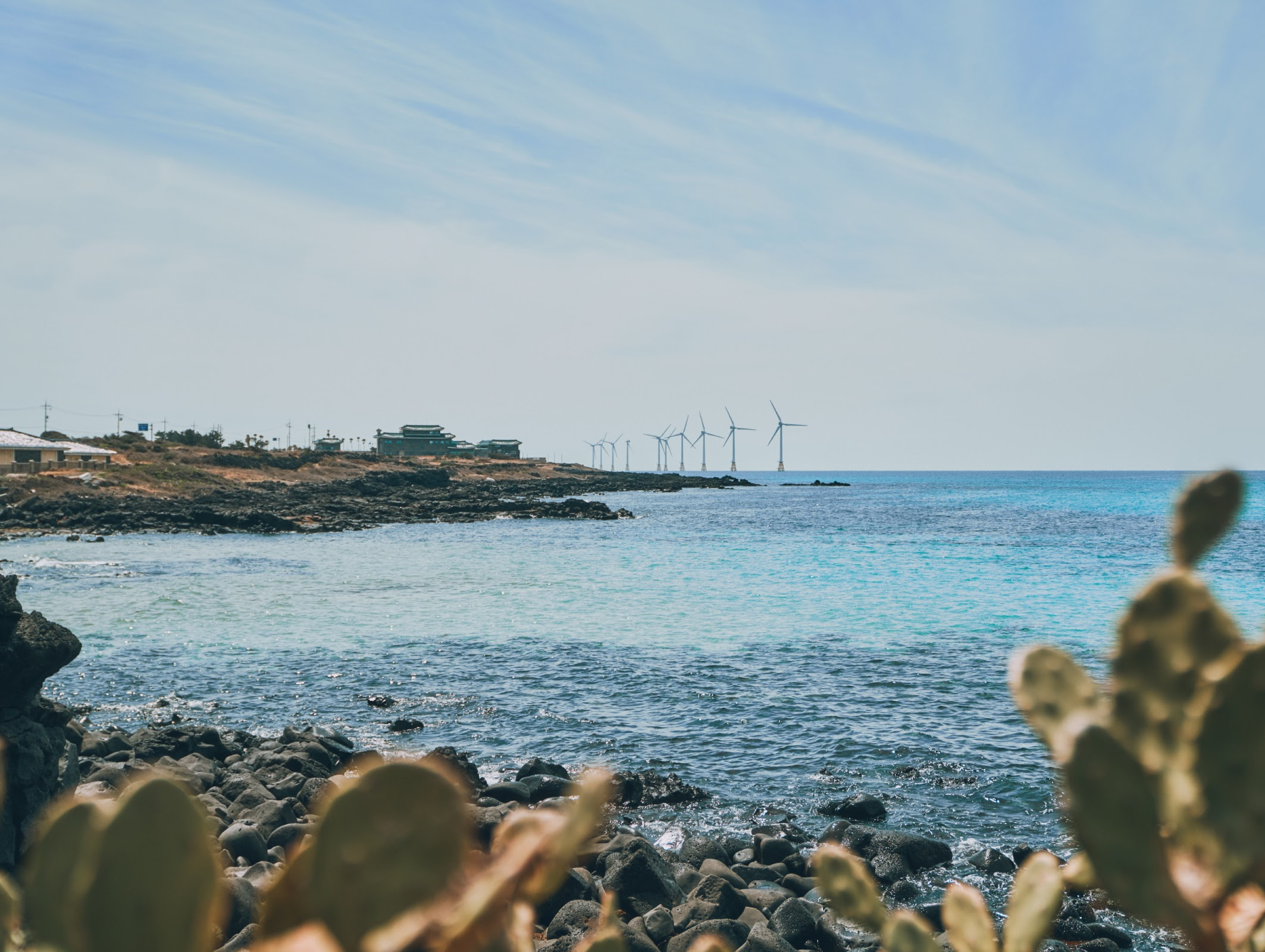
A cactus habitat and offshore wind turbines, viewed from Route 14

Route 14: Jeoji – Hallim Olle (저지 – 한림 올레)

Total distance: 19.1 km; total time: 6–7 hours; difficulty: medium

Route 14 goes from green gotjawal forest to the ocean, passing scenic walls, the artists' village in Jeoji, farms, streams, cactus habitats, and sandy beaches.

Route 14-1: Jeoji – Mureung Olle (저지 – 서광 올레)

Total distance: 9.3 km; total time: 3–4 hours; difficulty: easy

Route 14-1 finishes at the O'sulloc green tea fields, passing through forests and farms. The highlight is reaching Mundoji Oreum's volcanic peak, which offers panoramic views of mountains and forests.

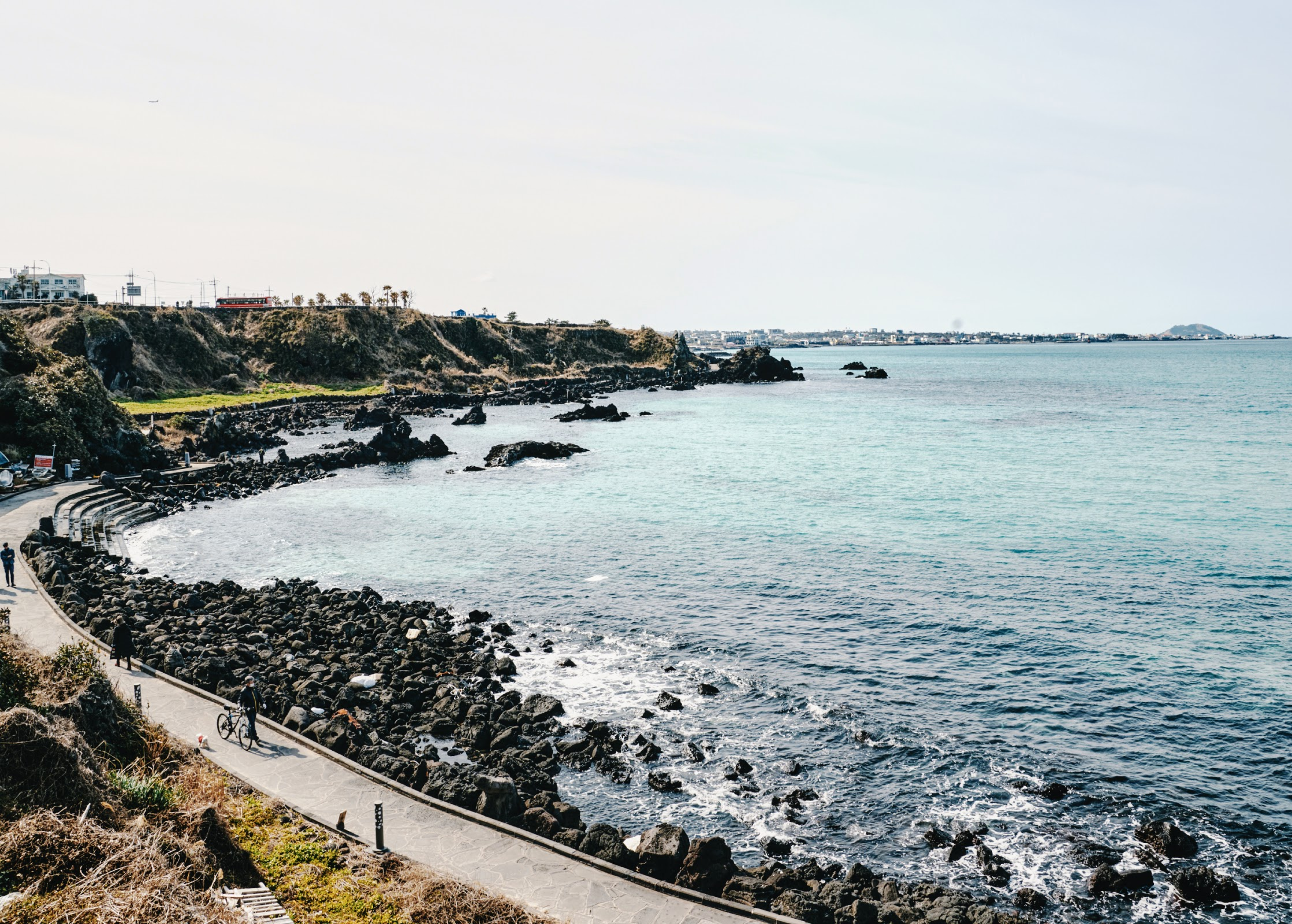
The Handam Trail, part of Route 15-B in Aewol, Jeju City

Route 15: Hallim – Gonae Olle (한림 – 고내 올레)

Total distance: (A) 16.5 km (B) 13 km total time: (A) 5–6 hours (B) 4–5 hours; difficulty: (A) medium (B) easy

Route 15 is divided into courses A and B, passing through fields, woods, and a dirt road. Geumsan Park's forest path is the highlight, leading to Gonae-pogu port after passing the Gwa Oreum volcanic cone and the Dosegi Forest pathway. Its friendship trail is the Raknus Selu Trail in Taiwan.

Route 16: Gonae – Gwangnyeong Olle (고내 – 광령 올레)

Total distance: 15.8 km; total time: 5–6 hours; difficulty: medium

Route 16 passes by traditional salt fields, forests, stone-walled villages, and farmland. The midpoint stamp is at Hangpaduri Hangmong Historic Site, which is known for its canola flowers in spring and cosmos in fall. Its friendship trail is Tottori Yurihama Course in Japan.

Route 17: Gwangnyeong – Old Downtown of Jeju-si Olle (광령 – 제주원도심 올레)

Total distance: 18.1 km; total time: 6–7 hours; difficulty: medium

A forest path runs along Musucheon stream to the center of Jeju City, Jeju International Airport, and the dragon-like Yongduam Rock and Yongyeon Bridge.

Route 18: Old Downtown of Jeju-si – Jocheon Olle (제주원도심 – 조천 올레)

Total distance: 19.8 km; total time: 6–7 hours; difficulty: medium

Route 18 runs from the center of old downtown Jeju City, past Sarabong and Byeoldobong peaks, and passes by Jeju-hang (port). Along the sea, the path goes to Sinchon village and further east, on Route 19, is Iho Tewoo Beach, Dodubong peak, and Gimnyeong beach.

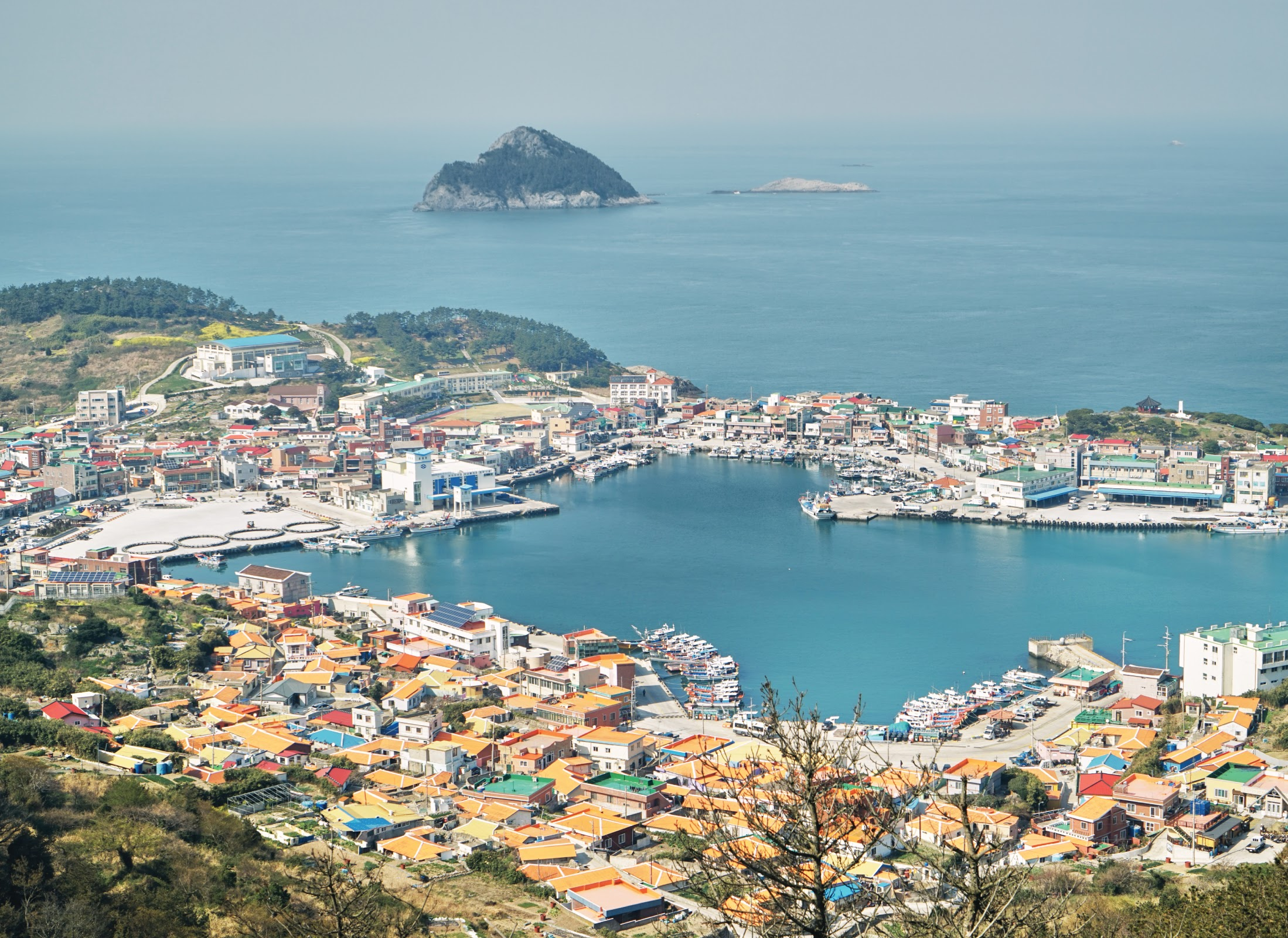
Sang-chuja port, as seen from Route 18-1

Route 18-1: Sangchujado Island Olle (상추자 올레)

Total distance: 11.4 km; total time: 4–5 hours; difficulty: high

The Chuja Islands are made up of four inhabited and 38 uninhabited islands. It takes about an hour to get there by ferry from Jejuhang port. Route 18-1 (sang, meaning "upper") and 18-2 (ha, meaning "lower") used to be one Olle trail, but it has more recently been split into two, due to their difficulty level and remote location. Its friendship trail is the Sifnos Trail in Greece.

Route 18-2: Hachujado Island Olle (하추자 올레)

Total distance: 9.7 km; total time: 3–4 hours; difficulty: high

Route 18-2 offers a view of mountains and villages from Sinyang-hang (port) to the Chuja-myeon village office. It extends up Jolboksan and Daewangsan for a panoramic view of the ocean from the mountaintop. After the Muk-ri supermarket, it enters a forest. Its friendship trail is Skiathos Trail 06 – the Roads of the Castle, in Greece.

Route 19: Jocheon – Gimnyeong Olle (조천 – 김녕 올레)

Total distance: 19.4 km; total time: 6–7 hours; difficulty: medium

Along Route 19, there is a range of scenery, including fields, Iho Tewoo and Gimnyeong beaches, and farms. It also includes historical sites, such as Jocheon Manse Dongsan and the Neobeunsungi 3 April memorial hall. Its friendship trail is the Bibbulmun Track in Australia.

Route 20: Gimnyeong – Hado Olle (김녕 – 하도 올레)

Total distance: 17.6 km; total time: 5–6 hours; difficulty: medium

Jeju Olle's northeast coastal trail has views of the ocean as well as Gimnyeong beach, and potentially of haenyeo divers at work.

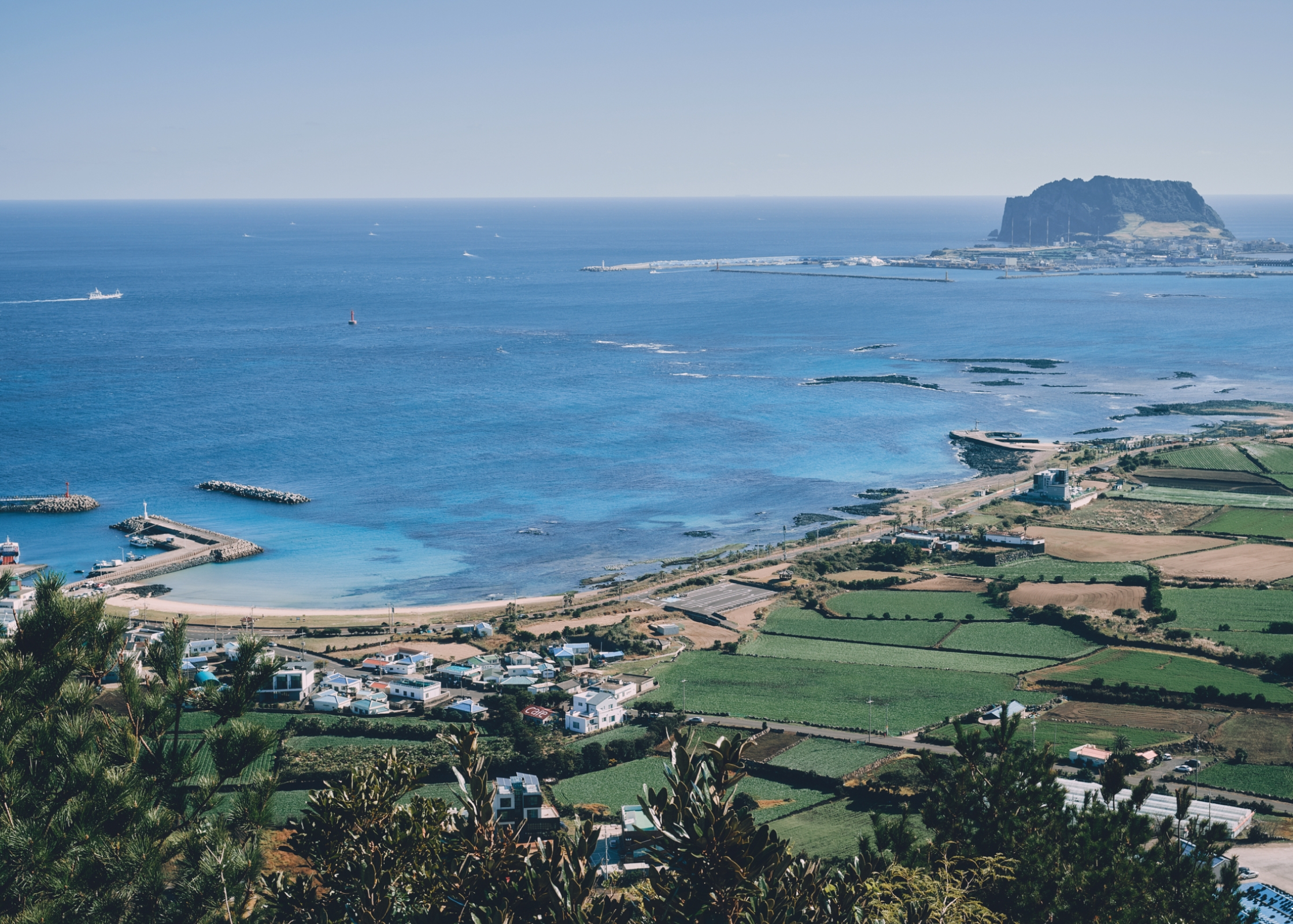
View of Seongsan Ilchulbong (Sunrise Peak) from Route 21

Route 21: Hado – Jongdal Olle (하도 – 종달 올레)

Total distance: 11.3 km; total time: 3–4 hours; difficulty: easy

This trail from Gujwa-eup has diverse scenery, including coastal roads and volcanic cones. It leads to Jimibong, on the easternmost part of Jeju Island, with panoramic views of the surrounding area. Route 21 finishes near the start Route 01, completing the full circumference of the island, totalling 437 km.

== Signage and accessibility ==
The Jeju Olle Foundation has created several kinds of signage to provide hikers with information about each route. Color-coded markers indicate the forward and reverse directions of each trail and are placed at strategic intervals. Engraved maps and trail details are affixed to sign-stones placed at the start of each trail.

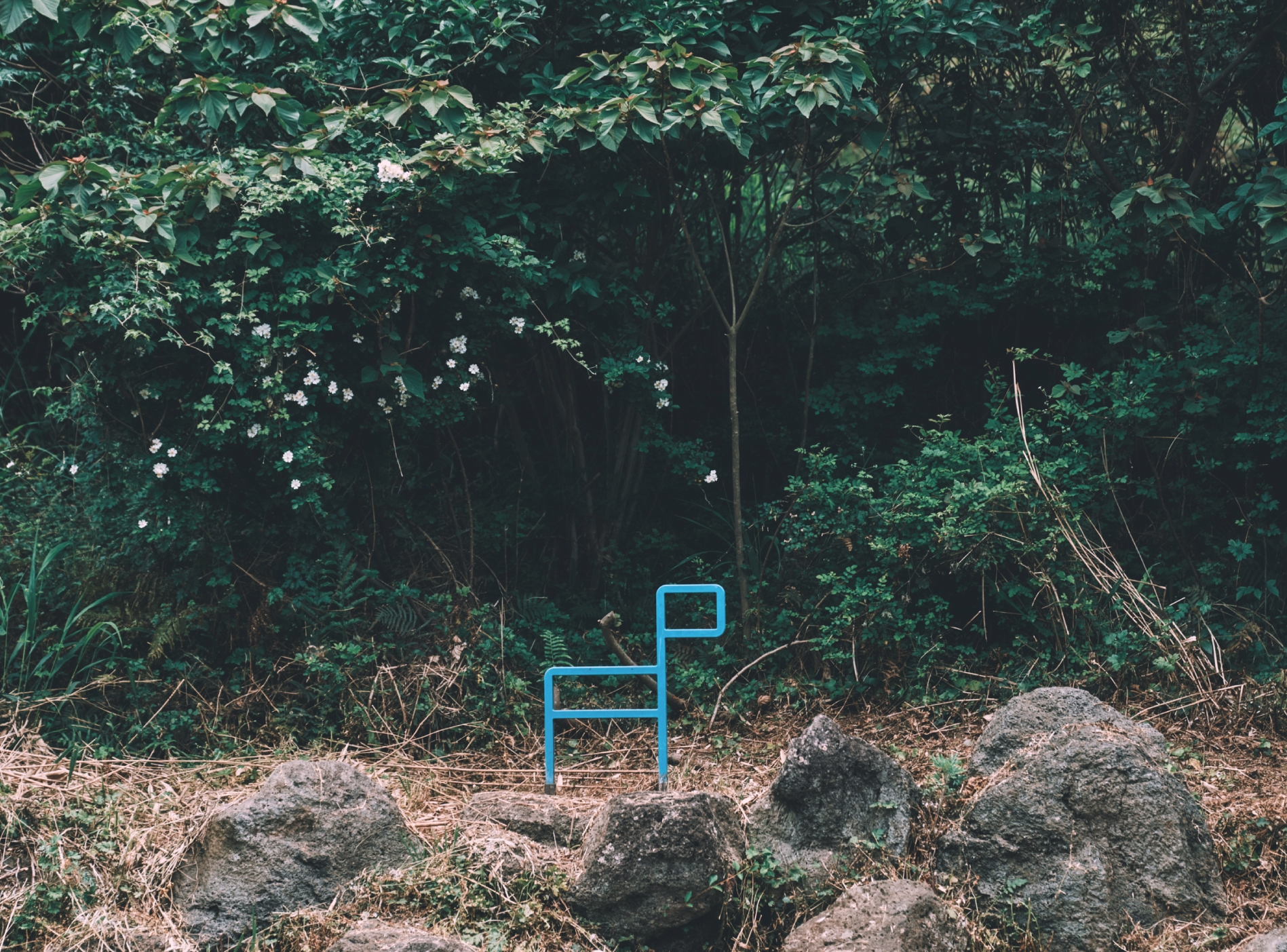
Jeju Olle Trail ganse signage along Route 16

The pony-shaped blue sculpture called ganse symbolizes both the trail and the Jeju Olle Foundation. Its name is derived from ganse-dari, meaning "slow idler" in the Jeju language, thereby capturing the spirit of leisurely walking on the trail. The ganse serves as a guide to hikers, pointing them in the right direction at forked paths along the trail.

Vibrant blue ribbons representing the ocean and orange ribbons symbolizing Jeju satsumas are tied to trees and utility poles to help hikers navigate the trail. Ribbons are hung slightly above eye level and are easily visible from a distance.

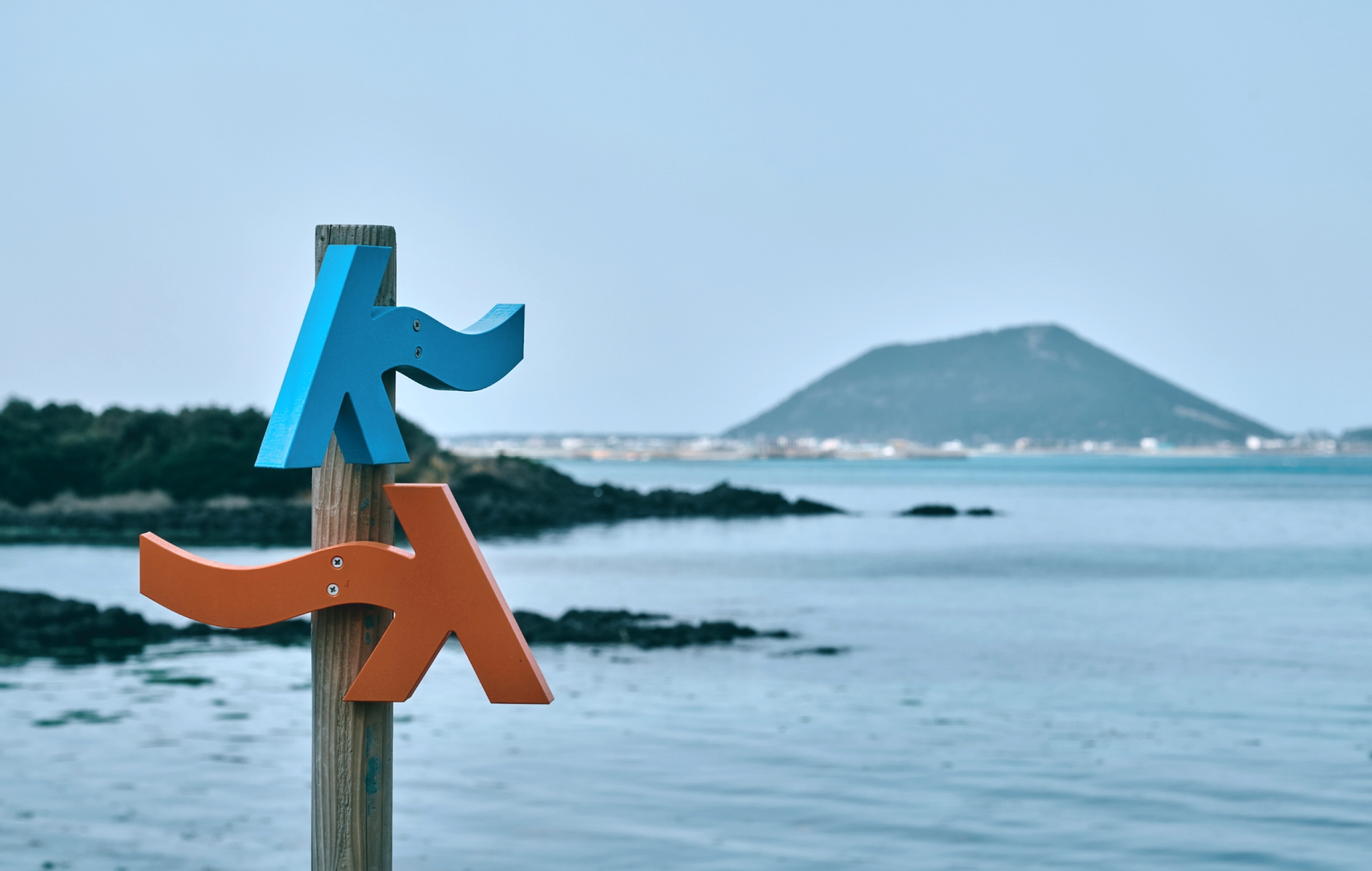
Jeju Olle Trail arrow signage along Route 01

The blue arrows, which can be found on the ground, stone walls, and utility poles, guide hikers. Orange arrows indicate the reverse direction of the trail. These arrows serve as crucial markers to ensure that hikers can find their way along sometimes forested or confusing sections of the trail.

Signposts are strategically placed in potentially hazardous areas or at temporary detour points along routes. Details include the detour route, a map, total time required, and distance. Detours are marked with two orange stripes to ensure that hikers can easily identify these alternative routes and stay on track.

The starting point of the wheelchair-accessible area is marked with an 'S' on the ganse's saddle, while the finishing point is marked with an 'F'. To help wheelchair users navigate the trail, wheelchair stickers are placed on the blue arrows, indicating forward direction (in a clockwise direction). At present, Olle trails 1, 4, 5, 6, 8, 10, 10-1, 12, 14, and 17 have wheelchair-accessible sections.

The starting and finishing points of each route are marked by sign-stones crafted from native basalt. At these points, hikers can find maps and course information for each route.

At the starting points, midpoints, and finishing points of each route are ganse-shaped stamp stations, where a stamp for each route, with a unique symbol, can be found. The head of the stamp post contains a stamp of each route and ink. A finisher's certificate and a medal are given to hikers who collect all three stamps for each route in their Jeju Olle passport. If up to three mid-course stamps out of the 27 courses are missed, a hiker is still eligible for a certificate of completion.

== Jeju Olle passport ==
The Jeju Olle passport is a pocket-sized document with route information, maps, and space to collect stamps for each trail. Hikers who collect all (or most) of these stamps may be eligible for an official certificate of completion.

Passport holders are eligible for special discounts at accommodations, restaurants, cafes, transportation, and some entrance fees to Jeju landmarks, such as the island's only aquarium, the Jeju Folk Village Museum, the World Automobile Museum, and ferry and rental car discounts. The discounts are offered for the convenience of hikers and to support the local economy.

== Thru-hike challenge ==
Jeju Island is only 250 kilometers in circumference, but the Jeju Olle Trail system covers a total distance of 437 kilometers. Its 27 trails are suited for thru-hikers, who can earn a certificate of completion or if they have also walked the Camino de Santiago in Spain, a second joint completion certificate.

After completing all 27 Jeju Olle Trail routes and collecting the necessary stamps, hikers have their document verified at a Jeju Olle tourist center. They will then be awarded a certificate and thru-hike medal, and they can optionally have their name and photo published on the Olle Foundation website.

A special certification program recognizes individuals who have covered more than 100 kilometers each of the Jeju Olle Trail and the Camino de Santiago, allowing them to apply for a certificate of completion for the mutual routes. Successful applicants are featured on the Jeju Olle Hall of Fame, with photographs and travel records.

== Events and activities ==
In addition to the administration and maintenance of the trail network, the Jeju Olle Foundation hosts a number of events and activities to promote Jeju Island's cultural and natural heritages. One of the largest annual events is the Jeju Olle Walking Festival, which began in 2010. It is held every autumn and attracts thousands of hikers to the island from the mainland and from overseas. Over the course of three days, participants walk a selected set of three Olle trails. Residents hold musical and dance performances and serve local dishes to participants. Another annual walking festival, aimed at children, is the Twinkle Twinkle Jeju Olle KIDS Walking Festival, which covers two 6 km routes over the two-day event.

== Jeju Olle Foundation ==
The Jeju Olle Foundation is a nonprofit organization responsible for building and operating the Jeju Olle Trail. It works with local organizations and residents, volunteers, and donors, to create content and programs using the trail. The foundation's work was recognized at the 21st International Trails Symposium in 2013 for working diligently to develop trails since its founding in 2007, receiving the inaugural International Award. The Olle Foundation has also hosted the International Trails Conference every year since its inception, in 2010. The foundation has also set up four "sister trails", on mainland Korea (Yangpyeong Mulsori Trail), Japan (Miyagi Olle and Kyushu Olle), and Mongolia (Mongol Olle). An international network of friendship trails includes Spain, Canada, England, Switzerland, Turkey, Greece, Taiwan, Australia, and Japan.

== See also ==
- Korea Dulle Trail
- Seoul Trail
- Dongseo Trail
