= Dongseo Trail =

Planned hiking trail in South Korea

Dongseo Trail (동서트레일) is a planned coast-to-coast hiking route in South Korea. A first for the country, it will span approximately 849 kilometres (527 mi), connecting the country’s eastern and western coasts. Inspired by Spain's Camino de Santiago, it is expected to be completed in 2026 or 2027. It connects various communities, offers scenic landscapes, and provides opportunities for rest and cultural immersion in towns along the way. Dongseo (hangeul: 동서 hanja: 東西) literally means "east-west" in Korean language.

== See also ==
- Seoul Trail
- Jeju Olle Trail
- Korea Dulle Trail
- Cheonggyecheon
- Urban regeneration in South Korea
- List of long-distance footpaths
- List of World Heritage Sites in South Korea
