= Songaksan =

Songaksan may refer to:

- Songaksan (Kaesong), a mountain in Kaesong, North Korea
- Songaksan (Jeju), a volcano in South Korea
