= Suh Myung Sook =

South Korean journalist (1957–2026)

- Born: October 23, 1957; Seogwipo, Jeju Province, South Korea
- Died: April 7, 2026 (aged 68); Seogwipo, Jeju Province, South Korea
- Known for: Creating the Jeju Olle Trail

Korean name
- Hangul: 서명숙
- Hanja: 徐明淑
- RR: Seo Myeongsuk
- MR: Sŏ Myŏngsuk

Suh Myung Sook (Korean: 서명숙; October 23, 1957 – April 7, 2026) was a South Korean journalist and founder of the Jeju Olle Trail. After working as the editor-in-chief of Sisa Journal and OhmyNews, she resigned and founded the Jeju Olle Foundation in 2007. Her work had a big influence on the economy of Jeju Province and inspired the creation of similar trails in other countries.

== Biography ==
Suh was born in Seogwipo, Jeju Province, South Korea on October 23, 1957. Her father was a North Korean defector from Musan County who deserted from the Korean People's Army and eventually settled on Jeju Island. Suh Myung Sook had two brothers. Her mother ran a store in the Seogwipo Maeil Olle Market. She lived on Jeju until she completed high school, then graduated from the education department of Korea University in Seoul in 1976. In 1979, she was arrested and served 236 days in prison for her pro-democracy advocacy under the Park Chung Hee administration.

=== Career in journalism ===
Suh worked for the university newspaper Korea University News (고대신문) while in school. After graduating, Suh worked for the magazines Madang (마당) and Hangukin (한국인).

In 2001, she was appointed editor-in-chief of Sisa Journal. In 2005, she was appointed editor-in-chief of the online newspaper OhmyNews.

=== Jeju Olle Trail ===
In fall of 2006, after feeling burnt out, Suh resigned her position and decided to walk the Camino de Santiago trail in Spain. The experience was transformative for her, and inspired her to create a similar trail for Jeju. In 2007, she established the Jeju Olle Foundation and began personally walking and creating trails on the island. She recruited her friends and siblings to help her find and create more trails.

The first trail opened in September 2007. The trails circumnavigated the island by November 2012, although they continue to be redesigned and added to. As of 2026, there are 26 trails with a total length of 437 km (272 mi). By 2025, 13 million people had walked on at least parts of the trail. Over 25,000 people have completed the entire trail. The impact of the trail on the economy of the island is significant, with the Jeju Institute estimating an annual economic impact of ₩1.2 trillion (US$844 million).

She also inspired and assisted the creation of similar trails in other countries. In 2012, four Kyushu Olle Trails opened in Japan. In 2017, the Mongol Olle Trail was established.

=== Later life and death ===
Suh was described as a notorious chain smoker. She was diagnosed with stomach cancer around a decade before her death. She quit smoking and drinking alcohol, but the cancer eventually spread to her lungs. Suh died on April 7, 2026, in Seogwipo. A funeral and memorial service was held for her on April 10 at Seobok Park, which is located on Trail 6 of the Jeju Olle Trail.

Suh was reputed to have a fiery disposition. Her tombstone, located in the temple Namguk Seonwon (남국선원) in Seogwipo, reads, "Hush, lest you wake the queen" (쉿, 여왕님 깨실라).

== Awards ==
- Ashoka Fellow (2017)
- Order of Civil Merit, Dongbaek Medal (2017)
- Order of Civil Merit, Moran Medal (2026)
