= Songaksan (Jeju) =

Volcano on Jeju Island, South Korea

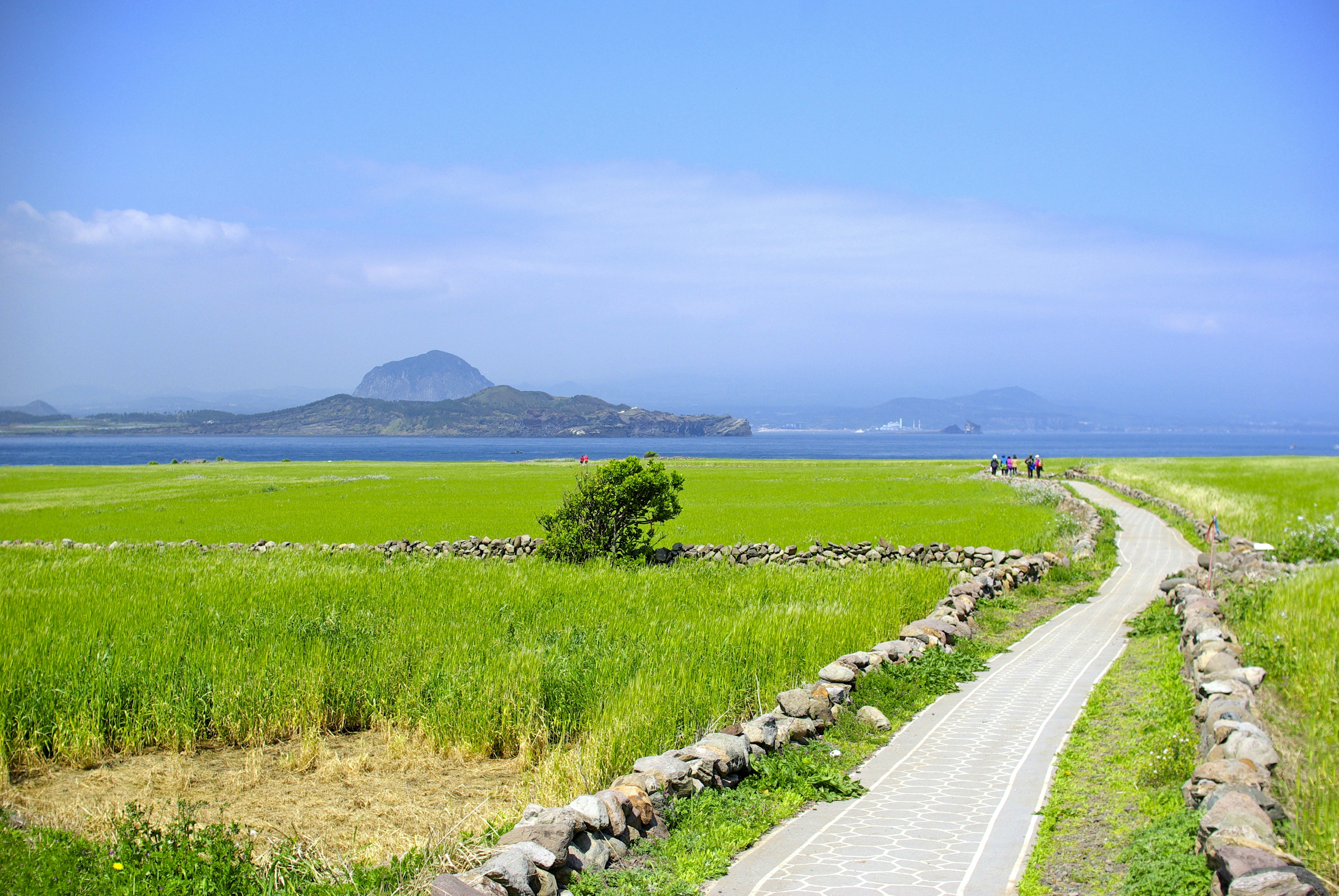
- The mountain is visible in the distance on the left, in front of the taller mountain Sanbangsan (2012)

Highest point
- Coordinates: 33.199°N 126.291°E

Geography
- Location: Seogwipo, Jeju Province, South Korea

Korean name
- Hangul: 송악산
- Hanja: 松岳山
- RR: Songaksan
- MR: Songaksan

Songaksan (Korean: 송악산) is a volcano on Jeju Island, South Korea, which has double craters and a parasitic cone. Crater 1 is about 500 m in diameter, 1.7 km in circumference. Crater 2, the mouth of the volcano in Crater 1, is about 400 m in diameter, 69 m in depth and leans vertically.

From Sanyisu-dong to the summit and ridge of Songaksan there are various trails along the coast and on the volcano. Songaksan is along Jeju Olle Trail Route 10. Songaksan makes a shore cliff to the south, and the south part of crater forms a low and flat grassland in front of which lie slopes. Black and red volcanic ash still remain inside the crater.

There is little forest except some areas of planted pines. The volcano's soil is arid, and its ecosystem is very simple. Few plants grow in Songaksan because due to grazing on its fields. Typical plants are perennial Artemisia and broomrape.

Because the Japanese army occupied Songaksan to use as a steppingstone toward its invasion of China in World War II, there are remains of their presence including an airstrip and airship sheds. Under the shore cliff, there are still 15 trenches remaining from that era.

From the observation platform, the southernmost Marado Island and Gapado Island appear very close. Diverse fish such as the saw-edged perch and black porgy are caught here.

== Gallery ==
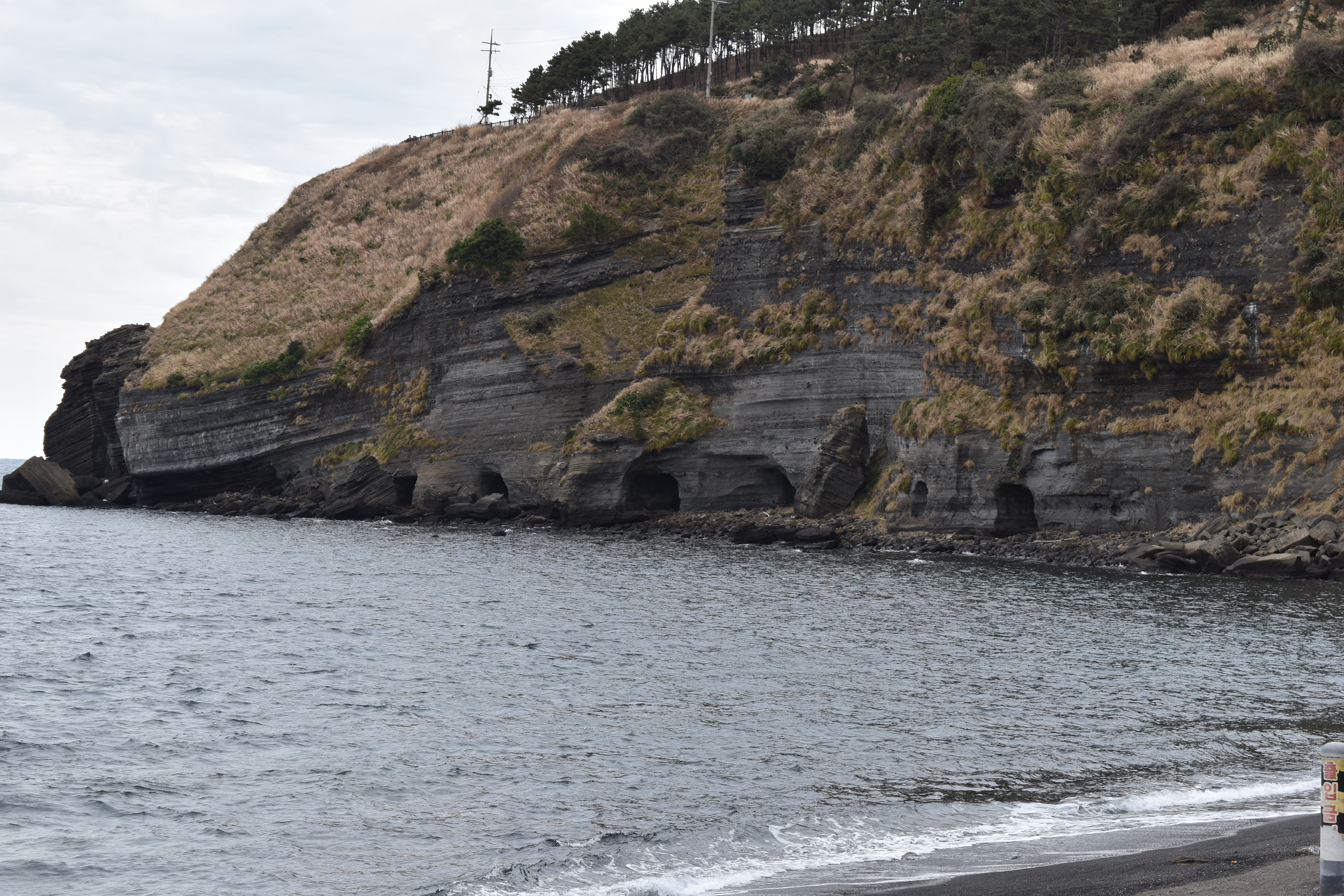
World War II–era caves dug out by Japanese soldiers on the coast of the mountain (2018)

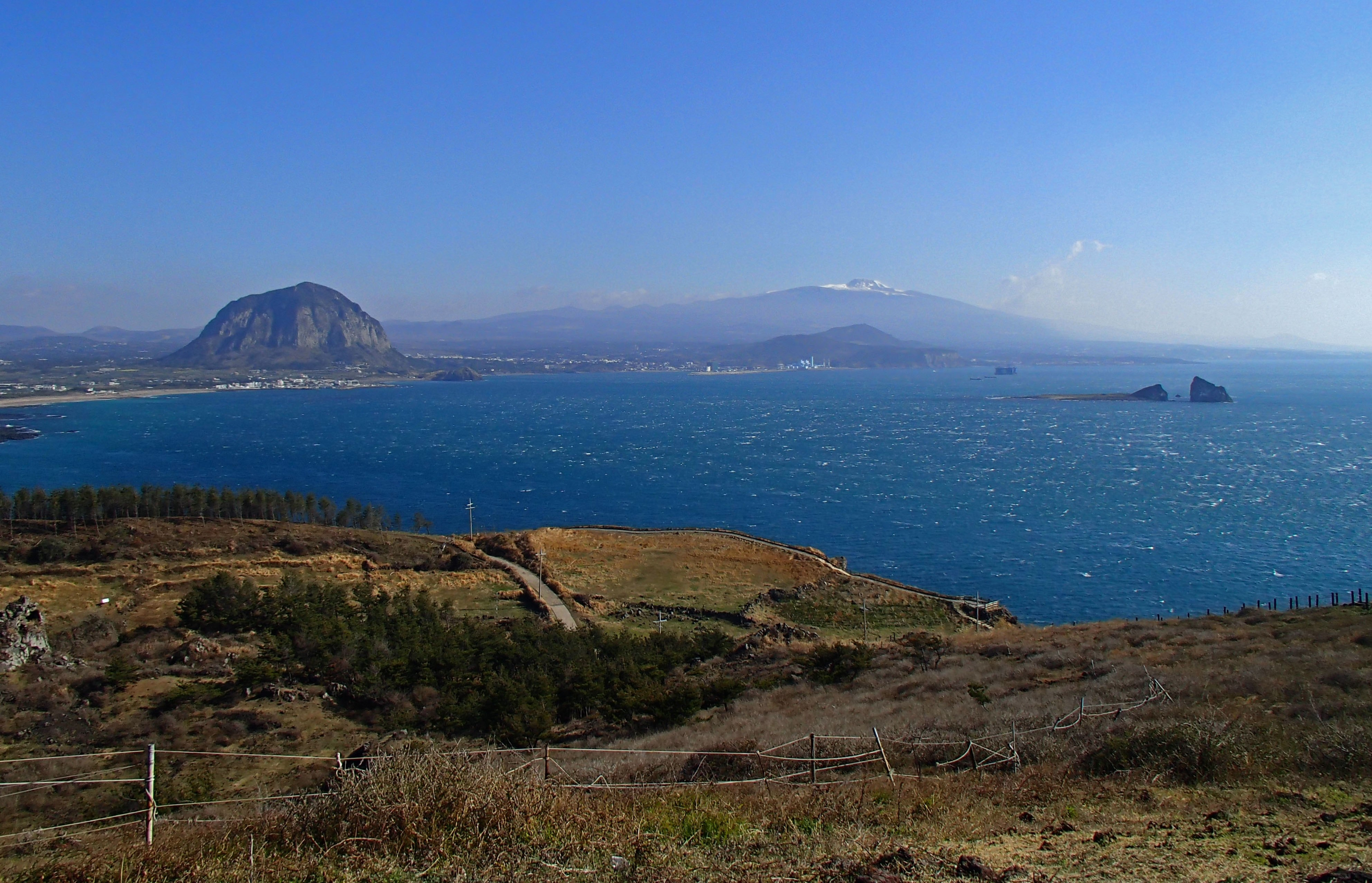
View from the top of the mountain. Sanbangsan is to the left (2014)

== See also ==
- Olle road
- Marado
- Hallasan Mountain
- Jeju uprising
- Jeju Volcanic Island and Lava Tubes
