= Soesokkak =

Natural landscape in South Korea

Soesokkak 쇠소깍 (Korean)
- Estuary
- Part of Soesokkak (2014)
- Interactive map of Soesokkak
- Coordinates: 33.2525°N 126.6236°E
- Location: Seogwipo, Jeju Province, South Korea

Korean name
- Hangul: 쇠소깍
- RR: Soesokkak
- MR: Soesokkak

Soesokkak (Jejuan: 쇠소깍), alternatively Soesokkak Estuary or Soesokkak River Pool, is a landform on Jeju Island in Seogwipo, Jeju Province, South Korea.

It is a valley concentrated around where the stream Hyodoncheon meets the ocean. It is famed for its natural beauty, with dramatic volcanic rocks, waterfalls, and dense plant life.

== Etymology ==
The landform's names come from the Jeju language. Its original name was reportedly "Soedun" (쇠둔), as it resembled a cow lying down. The name "Soesokkak" (쇠소깍) literally means "cow pool end".

== Description ==
The stream Hyodoncheon's course in this area was formed via a lava flow. On both sides of Hyodoncheon, there is dense plant life, with many pine trees. There are unusual volcanic rock formations all over the area (a number of which have been given names based on their shape), and a distribution of deep and shallow pools. As Hyodoncheon meets the ocean, the freshwater of the stream blends with the salt water, creating a brackish water ecosystem.

Soesokkak has a total area of 47,130 m^{2} (507,300 ft^{2}). It was listed as a Scenic Site of South Korea by the Cultural Heritage Administration on June 30, 2011.

It is a popular destination for visitors due to its scenic beauty and activities such as kayaking and traditional raft rides. It is located between routes 5 and 6 of the Jeju Olle Trail. Since 2003, the Soesokkak Beach Festival has been held near Soesokkak.

== Gallery ==
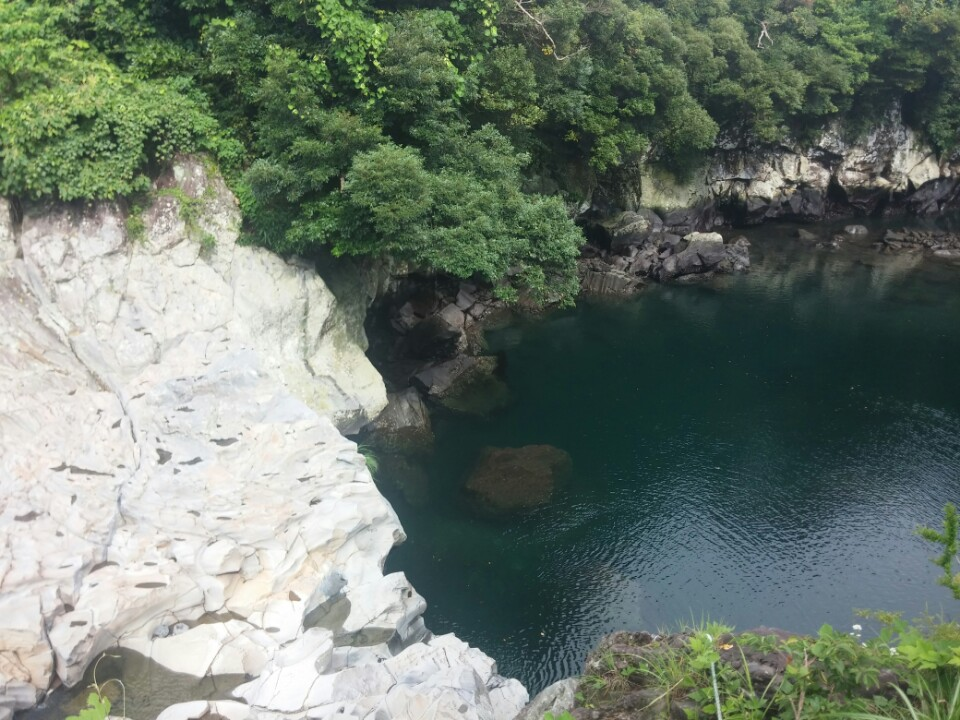
