= Jeju Olle Walking Festival =

Annual walking trail event in South Korea

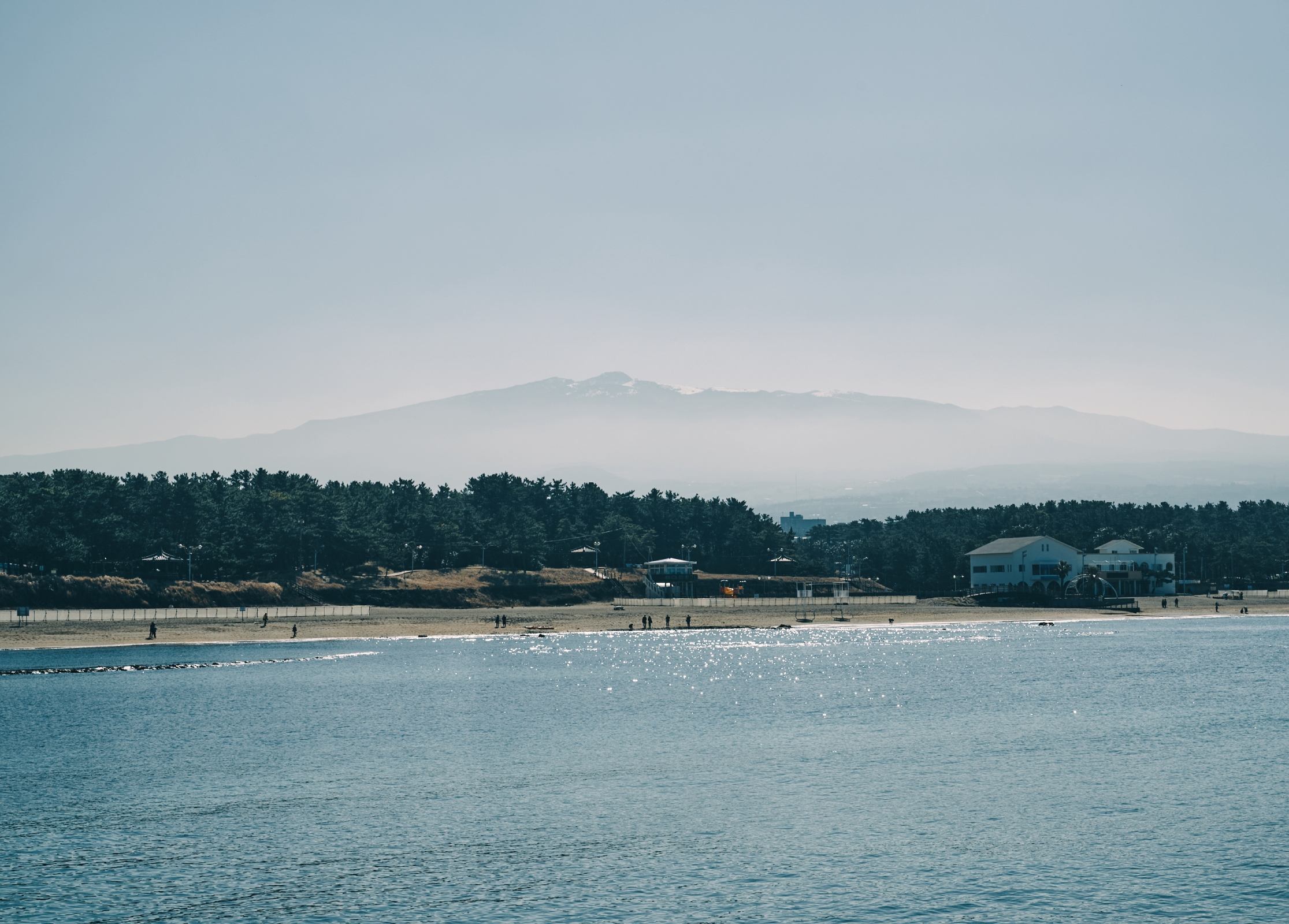
Iho Tewoo Beach on Route 17 of the Jeju Olle Trail.

The Jeju Olle Walking Festival (Korean: 제주올레걷기축제) is an annual walking trail event held along the Jeju Olle Trail of Jeju Island, South Korea. The festival began in 2010 and is organized by the Jeju Olle Foundation and local government offices. Each iteration highlights three different trails out of the 27 available, allowing local residents, hikers, and international visitors to appreciate the island's environment during its mild autumn weather.

The festival showcases the local cuisine and culture of a particular area with events and performances hosted by area residents. It generally attracts around 10,000 participants from all over Korea and overseas who hike one route per day.

During the COVID-19 pandemic it was scaled back in 2020 and 2021 to encourage individual hikes rather than group hikes (under the slogan "We Walk: Apart Together"). In 2022, it was canceled, along with many other events nationwide, in the immediate aftermath of the Seoul Halloween crowd crush.

The 2026 iteration of the festival was organized around Routes 19 and 20, totaling 37.4 km through the Jocheon, Gimnyeong, and Hado areas of eastern Jeju, from November 5 to November 8.
