= Daepo Jusangjeolli Cliff =

Rock formation on Jeju, South Korea

Daepo Jusangjeolli Cliff 주상절리대 (Korean)
- Columnar jointing
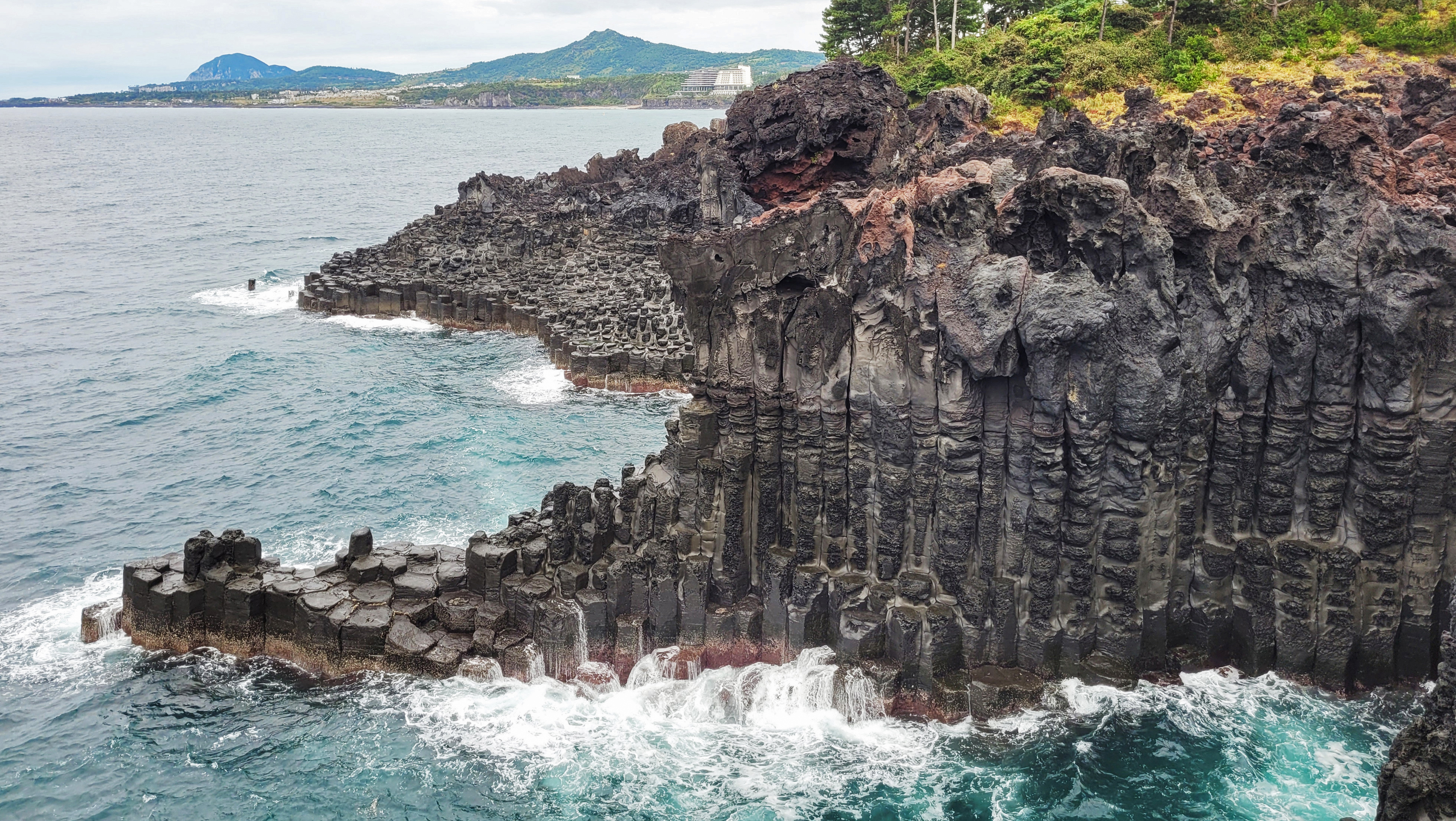
- The cliffs
- Interactive map of Daepo Jusangjeolli Cliff
- Coordinates: 33°14′12.10″N 126°25′31.20″E
- Location: 36-30, Ieodo-ro, Seogwipo, Jeju Province, South Korea
- Etymology: jusangjeolli (columnar jointing)

Daepo Jusangjeolli Cliff (Korean: 주상절리대; RR: Jusangjeollidae) is a volcanic rock formation at the southern coast of Jeju Island, South Korea. It is named for jusangjeolli, the Korean term for columnar jointing.

The cliff was formed when the lava from the island's volcano Hallasan flowed into the sea of Jungmun. The lava formed many rocks that resemble columns of geometric shapes. It was designated Natural Monument No. 443 on January 6, 2005.

The spot is now a popular tourist attraction. There is a scenic 20 m (66 ft) tall cliff that is popular for viewing and fishing.

== See also ==
- List of places with columnar jointed volcanics
