= Seoul Trail =

Walking trail around Seoul, South Korea

- Length: 156.5 km (97.2 mi)
- Location: Seoul, South Korea
- Established: November 15, 2014
- Use: hiking
- Maintainer: Seoul Metropolitan Government
- Website: english.seoul.go.kr/service/amusement/seoul-trail/01-seoul-trail/ (in English)

Seoul Trail (Korean: 서울둘레길; RR: Seoul dulle gil) is a long-distance trail that goes around the perimeter of Seoul, South Korea. As of 2024, the full trail is 156.5 km (97.2 mi), although it is subdivided into 21 shorter routes. It is maintained by the Seoul Metropolitan Government, and first opened on November 15, 2014. It has since been updated and reorganized a number of times.

== Description ==
Each sub-trail takes between 2 and 5 hours to complete. The trails vary in difficulty, with some of the easier ones being recommended for families. For each sub-trail completed, one can get a stamp at a stamping station. These stamps are then put into a stamp book. People who receive every stamp will receive a Seoul Trail Completion Certificate. The trails have benches and places for shade installed, as well as attractions such as flower tunnels. The trail has closed-circuit security cameras and periodic police alert buttons to promote the safety of the hikers.

The course began development in 2009. It initially debuted in 2014 with 8 courses. In 2017, the Seoul Metropolitan Government released a mobile phone application for tracking one's progress on the trail. By December 19, 2023, 71,206 people had completed the entire trail.

On April 30, 2024, the trail had a significant revamp, and was dubbed "Seoul Trail 2.0". The trail was changed from 8 sub-trails to 21, with average lengths going from 20 km (12 mi) to 8 km (5.0 mi) and average completion time from 8 hours to 3. These changes were made to lower the barrier to entry for casual hikers. It was also done to attract more younger hikers, as over 80% of people who completed the trail by 2023 were over 40 years old. The information boards on the trail were revamped, reportedly to increase visibility and clarity of where trails began and ended, as well as how to get to the trailheads from subway stations. By 2024, it was reported that construction efforts were continuing to add further attractions and foliage to the trails.

== See also ==
- Korea Dulle Trail – a trail around the entirety of mainland South Korea
- Jeju Olle Trail – a trail on Jeju Island
