= Mongol Olle Trail =

Hiking trail in Mongolia

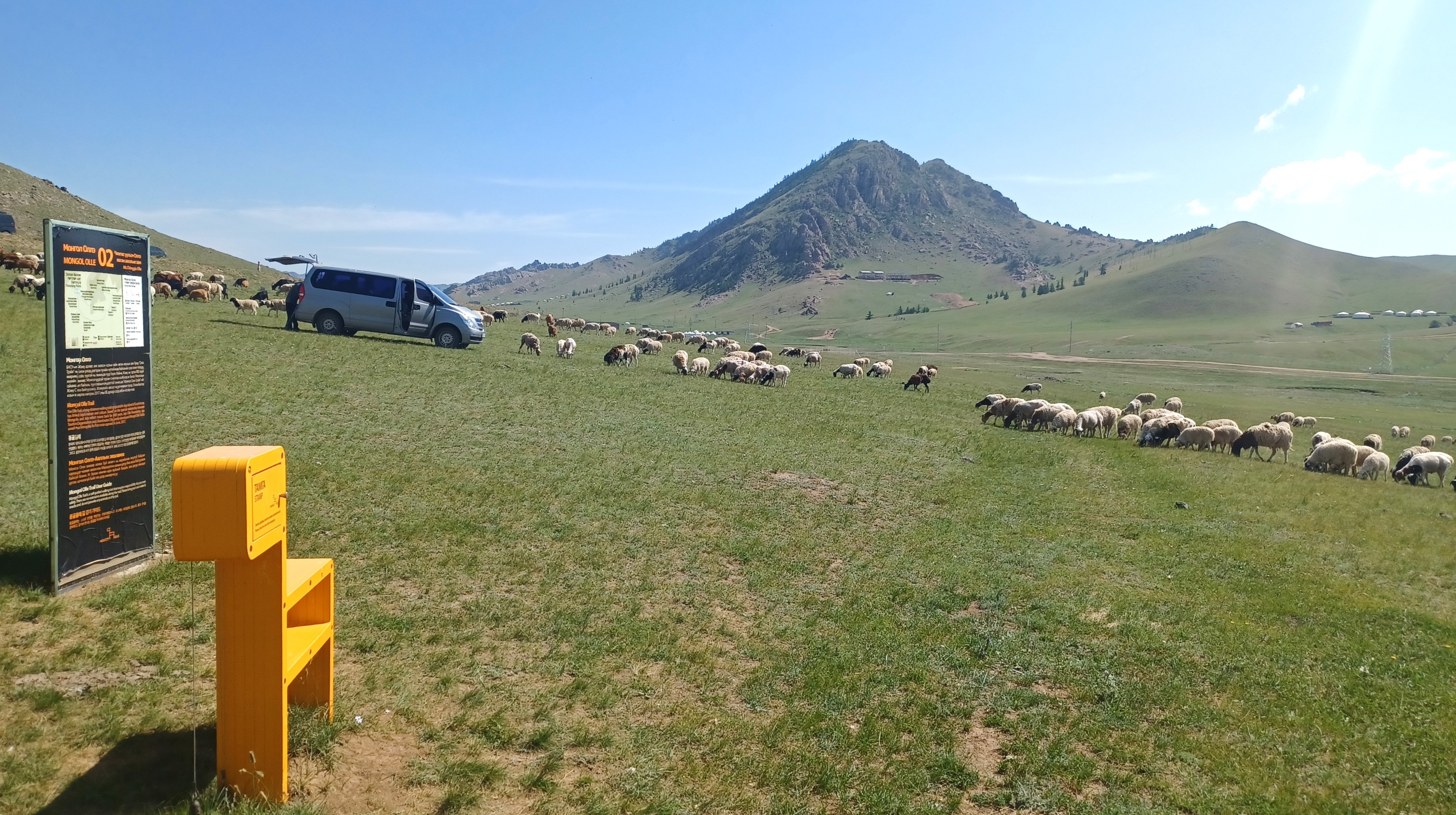
- A Ganse route marker along Route 2
- Length: 42 km (26 mi)
- Location: Bogd_Khan_Mountain, Gorkhi-Terelj National Park, Mongolia
- Established: 2017
- Difficulty: Easy, medium
- Season: Summer
- Months: June through September
- Sights: Bogdkhan Mountain Nature Reserve, Gorkhi-Terelj National Park, Tull River, Terelji River, Uguumurin Am, Khardag Khad

The Mongol Olle Trail (Mongolian: Монгол Оллэ) is a long-distance hiking trail in Mongolia that was established in 2017. The trail consists of three routes, with a total length of approximately 42 km. Route 1 is located in the area of Bogdkhan Mountain, and Routes 2 and 3 are within Gorkhi-Terelj National Park. It is named after Jeju Olle Trail and the Olle (올레), traditional walled paths to houses in Jeju Island, Korea.

== History and background ==
The Mongol Olle Trail incorporates elements of the Jeju Olle Trail in Jeju Island, South Korea, alongside Mongolia landscapes, cultural sites, and nomadic traditions. It is marked using blue and yellow ribbons and "Ganse" pony-shaped symbols. This trail represents the second international expansion of the Jeju Olle Trail's "Sister Trail" network, following existing trails in Kyushu and Miyagi, Japan. Developed by the Jeju Olle Foundation in collaboration with the Ulaanbaatar Tourism Authority in Ulaanbaatar City, the trail references a historical connection of 800 years between Jeju Island and Mongolia. This cultural exchange project aims to support sustainable tourism and provide visitors with hiking experiences that reflect Mongolian culture.

=== Cultural and natural features ===
The trail highlights aspects of Mongolian nomadic culture and the natural environment. It passes by traditional yurt camps, the round felt-lined dwellings used by nomadic herders in Mongolia. During the summer season, the grasslands along the trail exhibit a wide array of wildflowers. The trail is also associated with the annual Ulaanbaatar Walking Festival, which takes place in August.

== Routes and features ==
Route 1: Bogdkhan Mountain

Total Distance: 14 km Total Time: 5 to 7 hours Difficulty: Medium

Starting in Khonkhor Village, approximately 25 km east of Ulaanbaatar, this route traverses the Bogdkhan Mountain Nature Reserve, an area noted for wildflowers, wide views, and cultural shrines (ovoo). The trail includes initial uphill sections followed by downhill and level sections. Points of interest include ovoo shrines, coniferous forests, open plains, and Gunjvil Tourist Camp, a yurt camp located midway along the route. The route concludes at the Tuul Rail Junction, offering views of the surrounding grasslands and mountains.

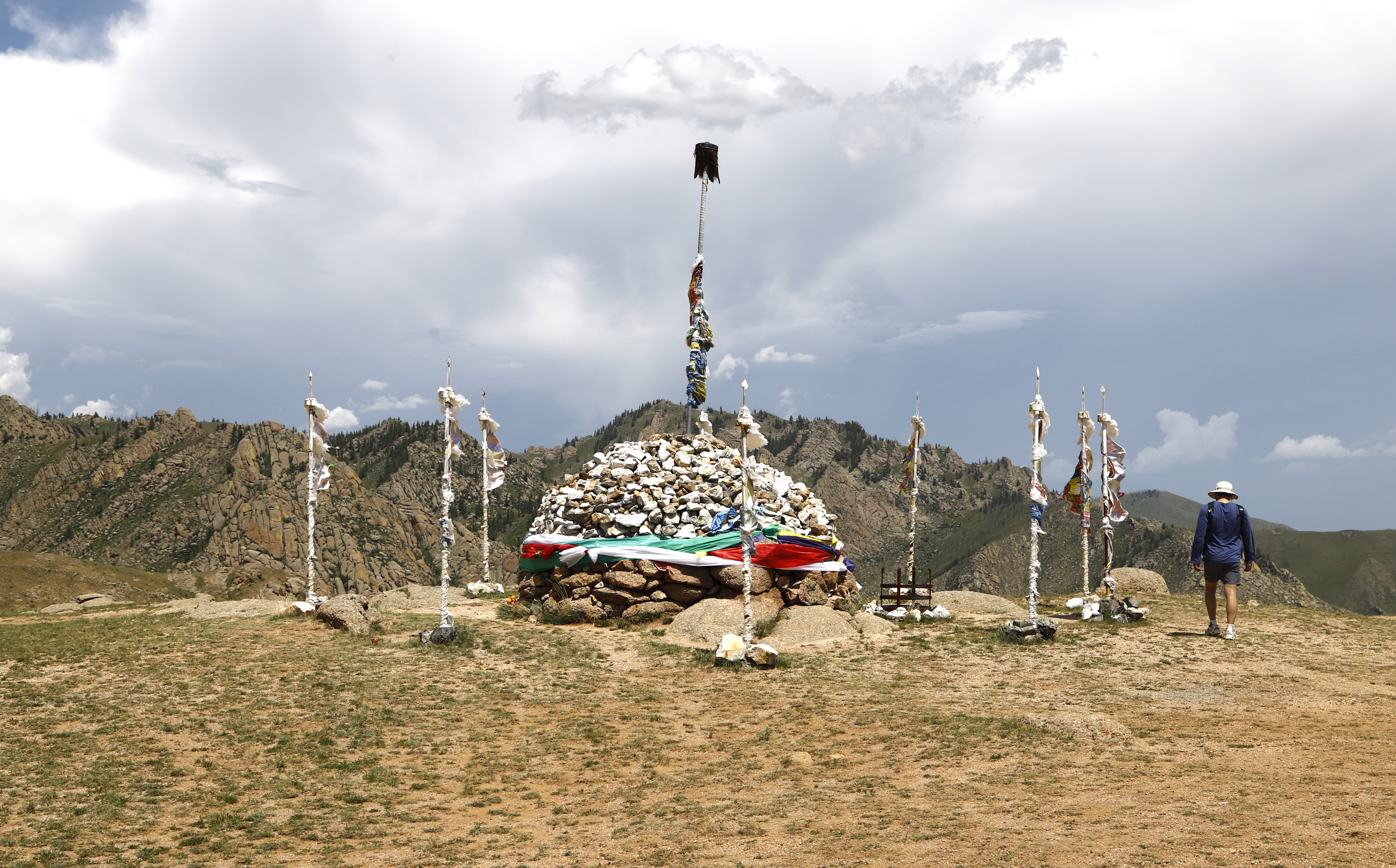
An Ovoo stone shrine along Route 2 of the Mongol Olle Trail

Route 2: Burkhan Khaldun (Mt. Chinggis) (Gorkhi-Terelj National Park)

Total Distance: 11 km Total Time: 3 to 5 hours Difficulty: Easy

Located about 42 km east of Ulaanbaatar, this route is situated within Gorkhi-Terelj National Park, a UNESCO World Heritage site. The trail begins at a yurt camp near the entrance, forming a loop that returns to the starting point. Notable features include the "wishing stone" rock formation, a river crossing over the Tull River constructed by Korean volunteers, and a sacred site known as "Black Flag Ovoo."

Route 3: Uguumurin Am (Gorkhi-Terelj National Park)

Total Distance: 16.8 km Total Time: 6 to 8 hours Difficulty: Medium

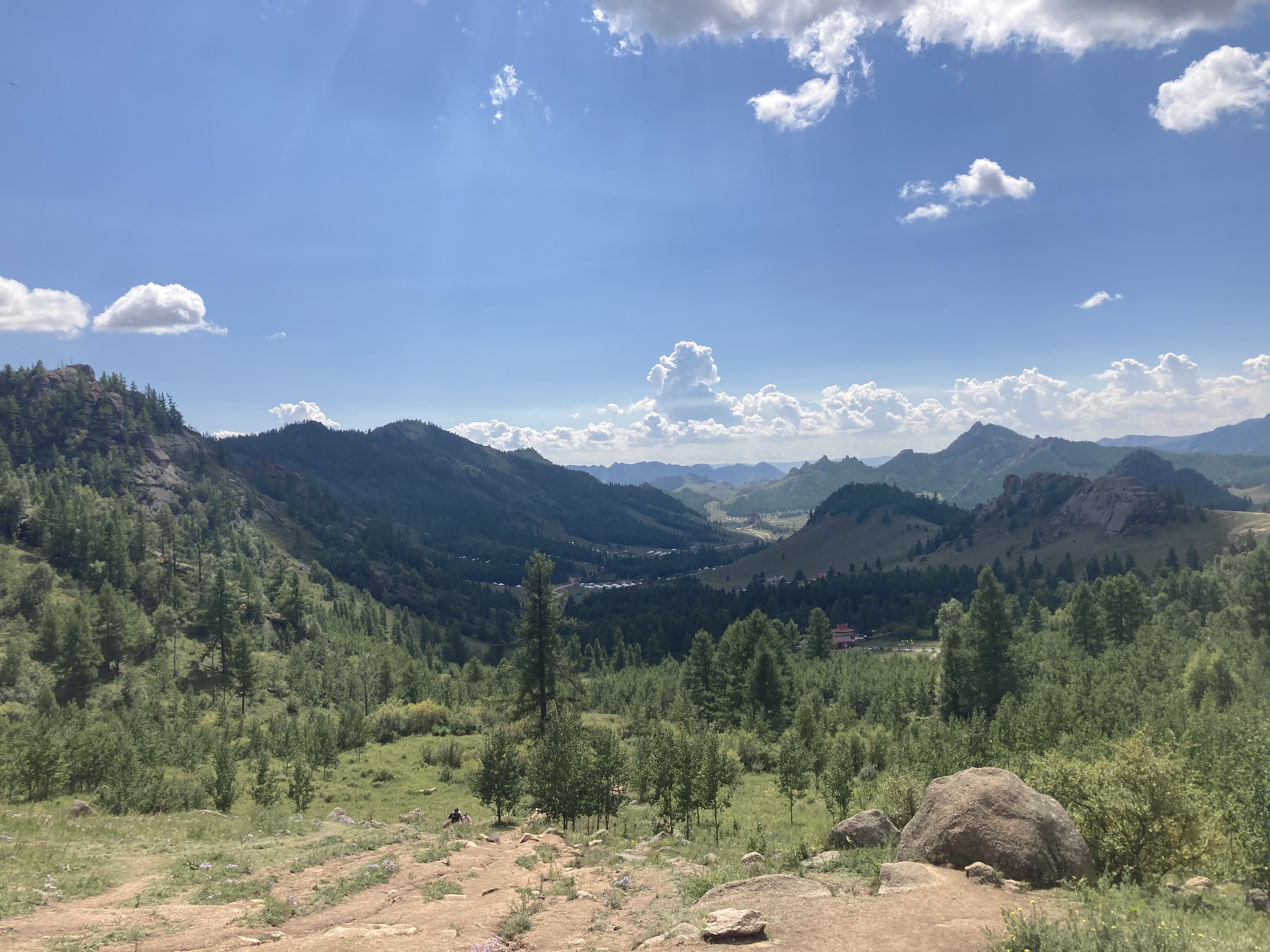
View from near Route 3 of the Mongol Olle Trail

This route in Gorkhi-Terelj National Park starts near the UB2 Hotel, passing through villages, camps, the Terelj River, plains with wildflowers, and forested areas. It continues through grasslands and forest paths towards a rock formation resembling a dinosaur or turtle. Key locations include Uguumurin Am, named after Ugumuur village, an area with a small nomadic population and limited infrastructure that has contributed to the preservation of its natural environment.

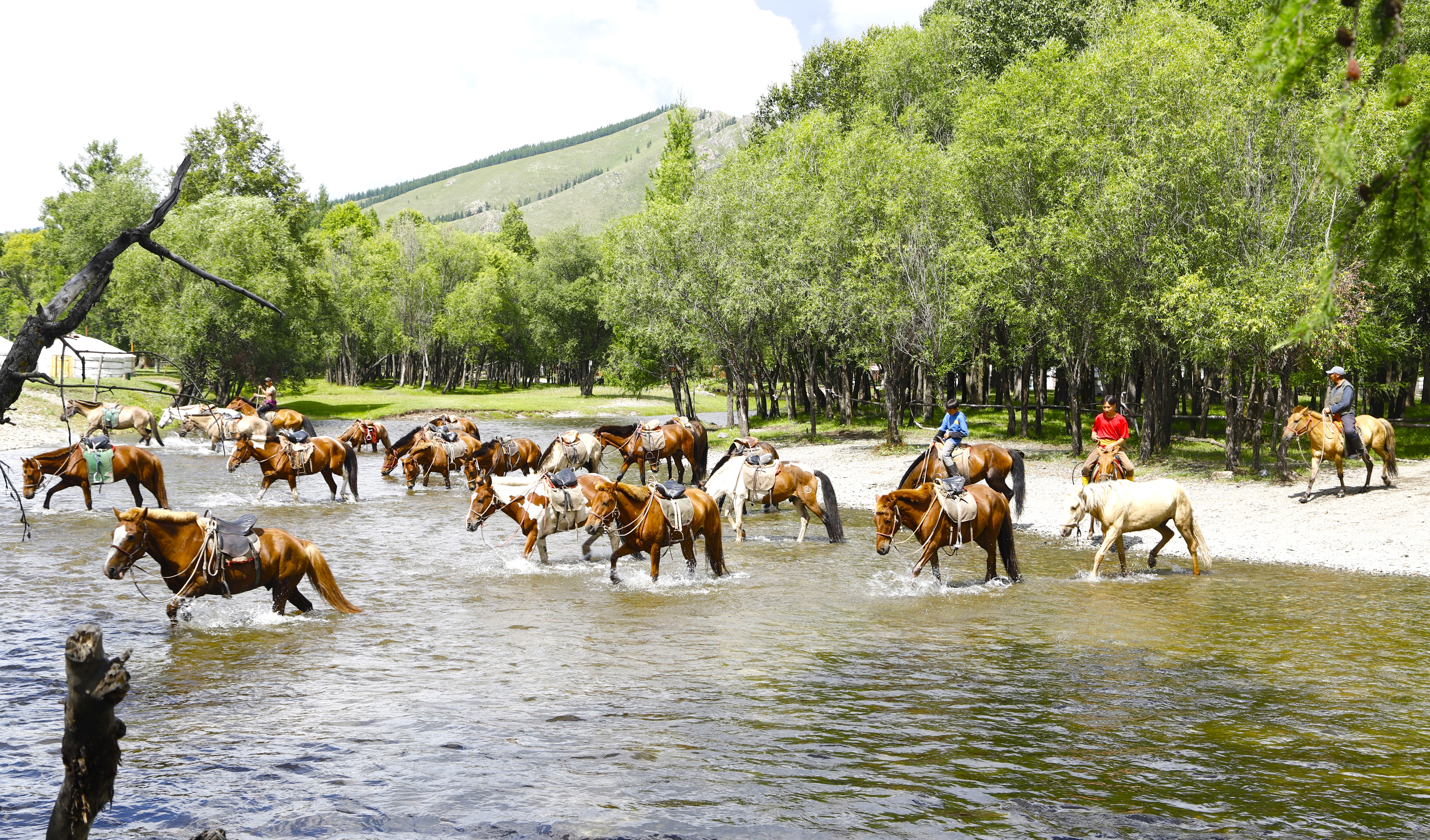
River crossing on horseback along Route 3 of the Mongol Olle Trail

Another point of interest is Khardag Khad ("observatory rock"), used by shepherds for observing livestock. The mountainous area displays varied ecological characteristics, with less dense vegetation on the south-facing slopes and denser forests on north-facing slopes.

== Trail signage and navigation ==
The Ganse symbol indicates the trail direction. Saddle Ganses with "S" (start) and "F" (finish) denote the beginning and end of each route. Directional arrows are also placed at intervals (3, 5, 7, 9, and 11 km from the starting point), and trail markers sometimes include ribbons on utility poles.

=== Practical information ===
The recommended hiking season is between June 10 and September 20, when the weather is most favorable. For safety considerations, hiking in groups is advised. Suitable footwear such as high-ankle trekking shoes is recommended, along with windproof outerwear, and sufficient water and food supplies. Drinking untreated river water should be avoided, and maintaining a distance from livestock and caution around dogs is advised. Insect repellent is recommended during summer, and strong fragrances may attract insects. Additional recommended items include sunglasses, sunscreen, lip balm, hats, basic medical supplies, a first-aid kit, and trash bags. Wet wipes and a compact umbrella may also be useful. Emergency contact numbers include ambulance (103), police (102), and forest fire assistance (101).

=== Transportation ===
Public buses and hired cars can be used to reach trailheads. Public transportation schedules may be variable, requiring advance preparation. Foreigner visitors are not permitted to drive in Mongolia without an International Driving Permit, and hiring a car with a driver is a common option.

=== Information centers ===
The Route 1 Khonkhor Information Center is located on "Seoul Street" in Ulaanbaatar. It is open from June to September, from 09:30 to 18:30. The Route 3 Terelj Information Center is located at King Jon's Hill, Ulaanbaatar, and also operates from June to September, 09:30 to 18:30. Operating periods may be subject to change based on local conditions.
