= Korea Dulle Trail =

Long-distance trail around South Korea

- Length: 4,500 km (2,800 mi)
- Location: South Korea
- Established: May 2016
- Use: hiking
- Maintained by: Korea Tourism Organization
- Website: www.durunubi.kr/eng/main.do/ (in English and Korean)

Korea Dulle Trail (Korean: 코리아둘레길) is a long-distance trail that spans 4,500 km (2,800 mi) that goes around the exterior of South Korea. The trail is subdivided into four sub-trails: Haeparang Trail, Namparang Trail, Seoharang Trail, and the DMZ Peace Trail. Each of these trails is subdivided into routes. People who complete each of the trails are reportedly given souvenirs.

Interest in such trails began around 2007, during the Lee Myung-bak administration. Haeparang Trail was the first to be developed; it began development in 2010. It informally opened in 2012 and officially opened in May 2016. In June 2016, the Park Geun-hye administration added more trails that would circle the entirety of the country. Work began on the trails in earnest in January 2017. After the Moon Jae-in administration took over in 2017, the project was scrutinized and reportedly almost scrapped. It continued, eventually resulting in the opening of Namparang on October 31, 2020. The trail is reportedly managed and funded mainly by the federal government.

== Subtrails ==
Sub-trails
Name	Length	Routes	Start	End
Haeparang Trail	750 km (470 mi)	50	Busan Oryukdo Sunrise Park	Goseong Unification Observatory
Namparang Trail	1,470 km (910 mi)	90	Busan Oryukdo Sunrise Park	Ttangkkeut Tower
Seohaerang Trail	1,800 km (1,100 mi)	109	Ttangkkeut Tower	Ganghwa Peace Observatory
DMZ Peace Trail	TBD	11	Ganghwa Peace Observatory	Goseong County, Gangwon

== See also ==
- Seoul Trail – a long-distance hiking trail around Seoul
- Jeju Olle Trail – a long-distance trail around Jeju Island
