= Sanbangsan =

Mountain in Seogwipo, South Korea

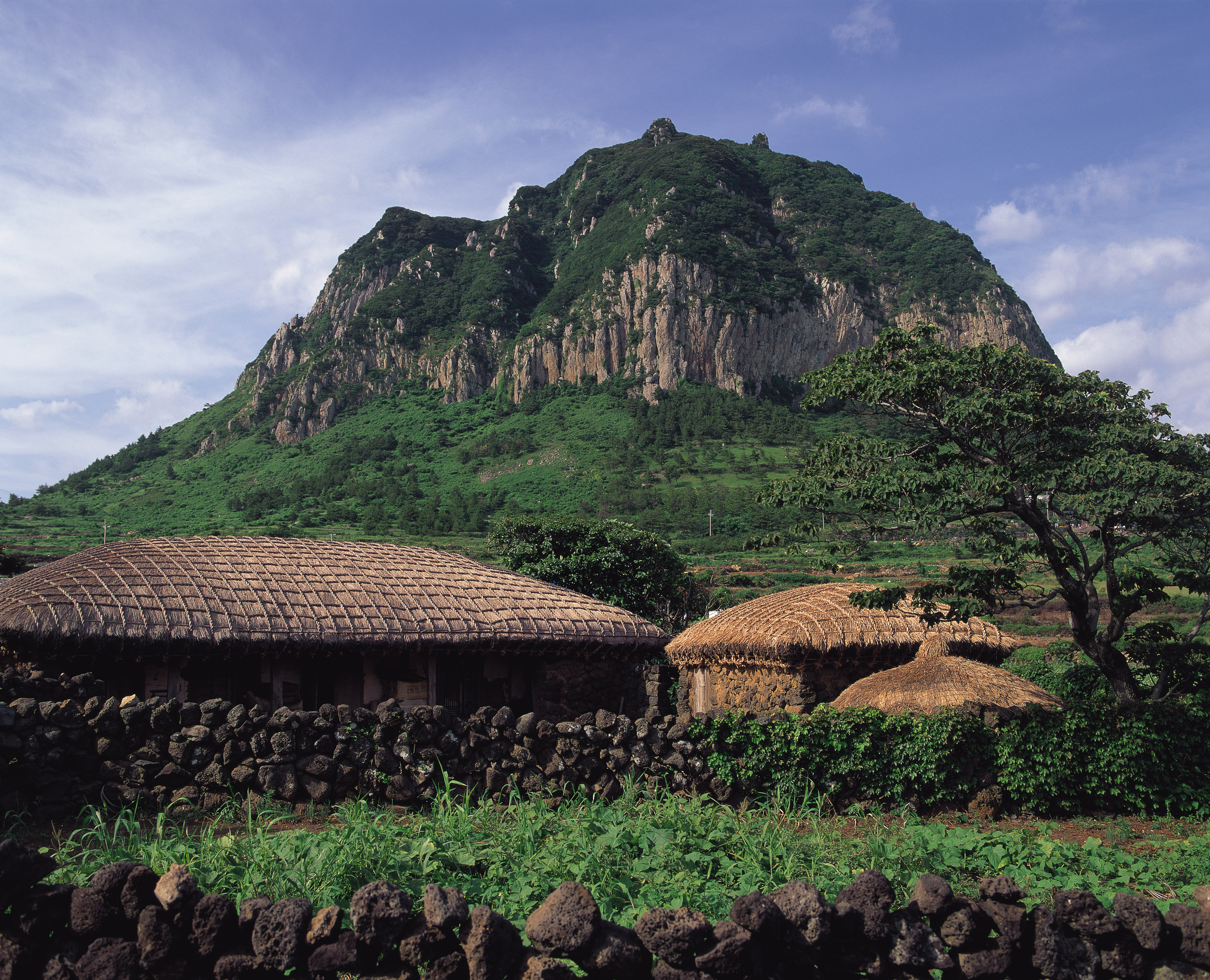
- The mountain, with traditional village in front (2011)

Highest point
- Coordinates: 33°14′30″N 126°18′47″E

Geography
- Country: South Korea
- Province: Jeju Province
- City: Seogwipo

Korean name
- Hangul: 산방산
- Hanja: 山房山
- RR: Sanbangsan
- MR: Sanbangsan

Sanbangsan (Korean: 산방산; lit. 'Mountain Room Mountain') is a volcano located on the southwest coast of Jeju Island, in Andeok-myeon, Seogwipo, South Korea. It is a trachytic lava dome that is 395 m (1,296 ft) tall.

Part of the Jeju Island UNESCO Global Geopark, the mountain is a popular tourist site and one of Jeju Island's main scenic geological features, alongside Hallasan and Seongsan Ilchulbong.

== Etymology and mythology ==
Sanbangsan means "mountain with a cave". This name refers to the cave Sanbanggul (산방굴; 山房窟), which is located on the mountain. Water that falls from the ceiling of the cave is said to be the tears of Sanbangdeok (산방덕; 山房德), a goddess that protects the mountain.

According to legend, the grandmother deity Seolmundae Halmang plucked Hallasan's peak and fashioned it into Sanbangsan's current form.

== Description ==
The mountain is a lava dome made of trachyte, and is largely a light gray color. It is 395 m tall. It is roughly circular, occupies 988.332 m^{2} (10,638.32 ft^{2}) of space, has a circumference of 3,780 m (12,400 ft), and has a diameter of 1,200 m (3,900 ft). Unlike many other oreum on Jeju Island, it does not have a volcanic crater at the top. It is visible from across much of southern Jeju.

Sanbangsan has columnar jointing stone structures, particularly on its southwestern slope, giving it a honeycomb appearance.

The mountain has many plants on it, including many species of trees. Plants grow even on some of its sheer cliff faces. In 1993, around 247,935 m^{2} (2,668,750 ft^{2}) of the cliff walls with plantlife were designated a Natural Monument of Jeju Province.

=== Sanbanggul ===
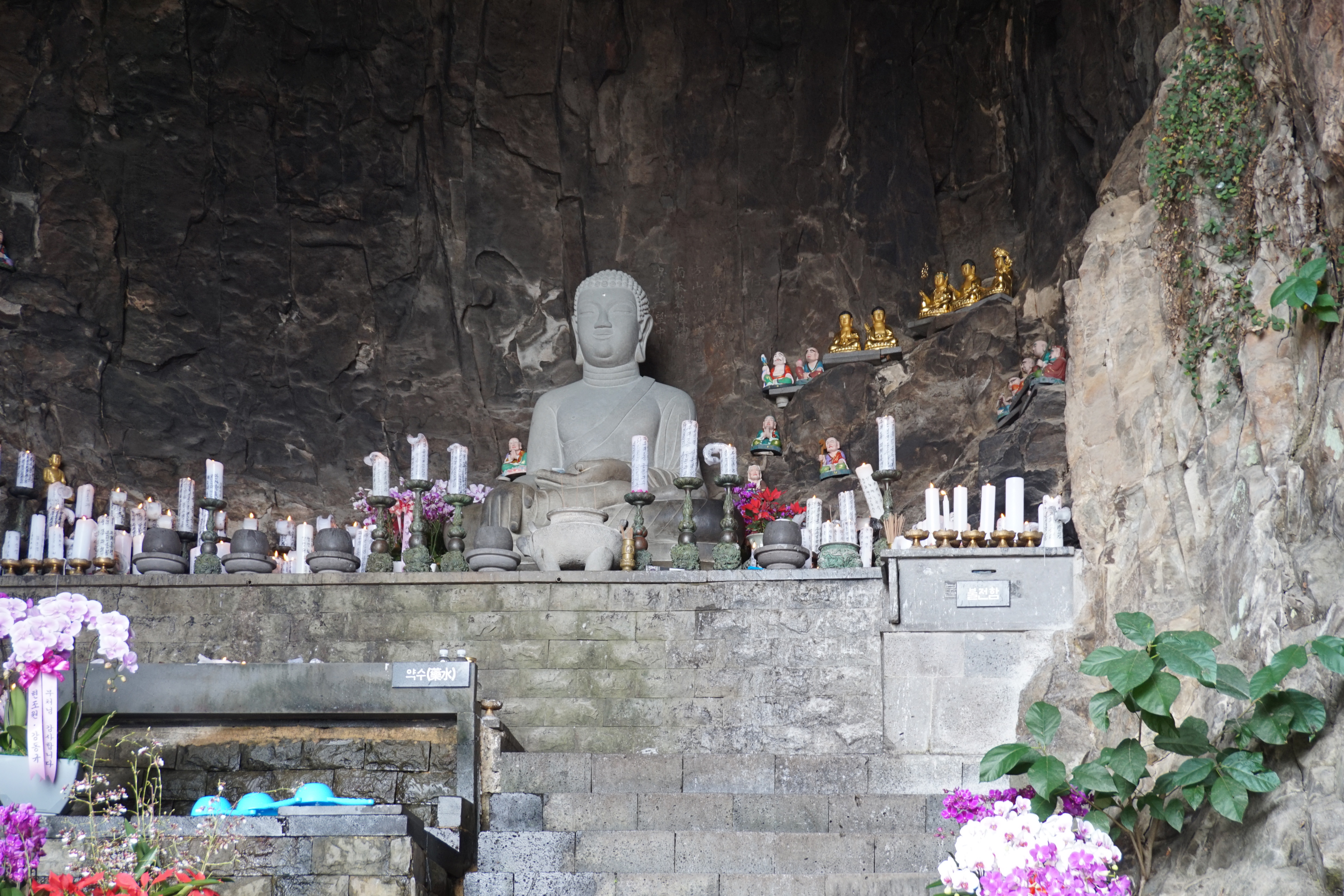
The Goryeo-era Buddha statue inside Sanbanggul (2022)

Sanbanggul is a cave that is around 145 to 150 meters up the mountain, on its south side. It is around 10 m × 5 m × 5 m (33 ft × 16 ft × 16 ft). The cave is possibly a sea cave from when the volcano was at a lower height, although it is possibly more likely tafoni (a cavity caused by other geological conditions).

The cave has been used as a Buddhist temple called Sanbanggulsa (산방굴; 山房窟) from since at latest the 918–1392 Goryeo period. Names of Joseon-era (1392–1897) officials are carved into the rocks of the cave.

A Goryeo-era stone Buddha statue has sat in the cave since 1985. That statue is said to have been taken by the Japanese during the 1910–1945 Japanese colonial period, and was returned in 1960.

== Tourism ==
Tourists are able to access Sanbanggul via a staircase.

Since January 1, 2022 and until December 31, 2031, access to much of the upper parts of the mountain is restricted for the sake of environmental protection. Summiting the mountain is currently not allowed. Previously, a path to summit the mountain was accessible from the northern side. The views from the top of the mountain are said to be breathtaking, and considered among the area's finest sights.

=== Immediate surroundings ===
Each spring, the fields surrounding the mountain has vibrant canola flowers. The mountain has a prominent view of the nearby volcanic Yongmeori Coast.

Various Buddhist temples exist around the base of the mountain, including the temple Bomunsa (보문사; 普門寺).

South of the mountain is a theme park called Sanbangsan Land (산방산 랜드). It has a pirate ship ride, a carousel, a 4D theater, and various carnival games.

== Gallery ==
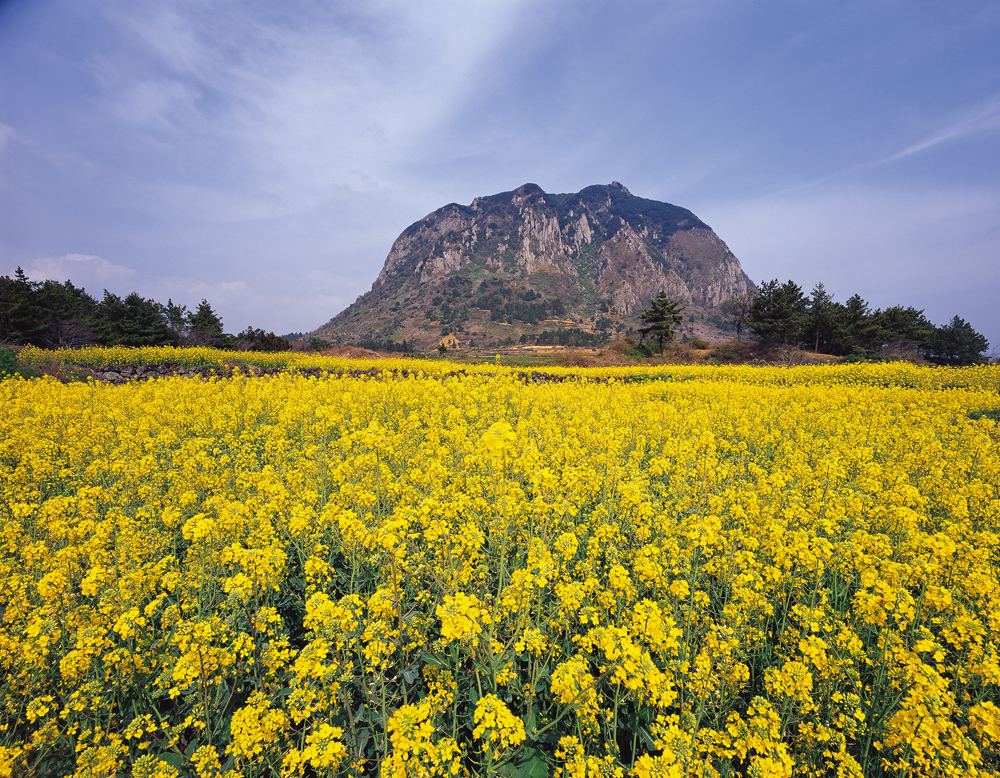
Sanbangsan, with nearby flower field in view (2011)

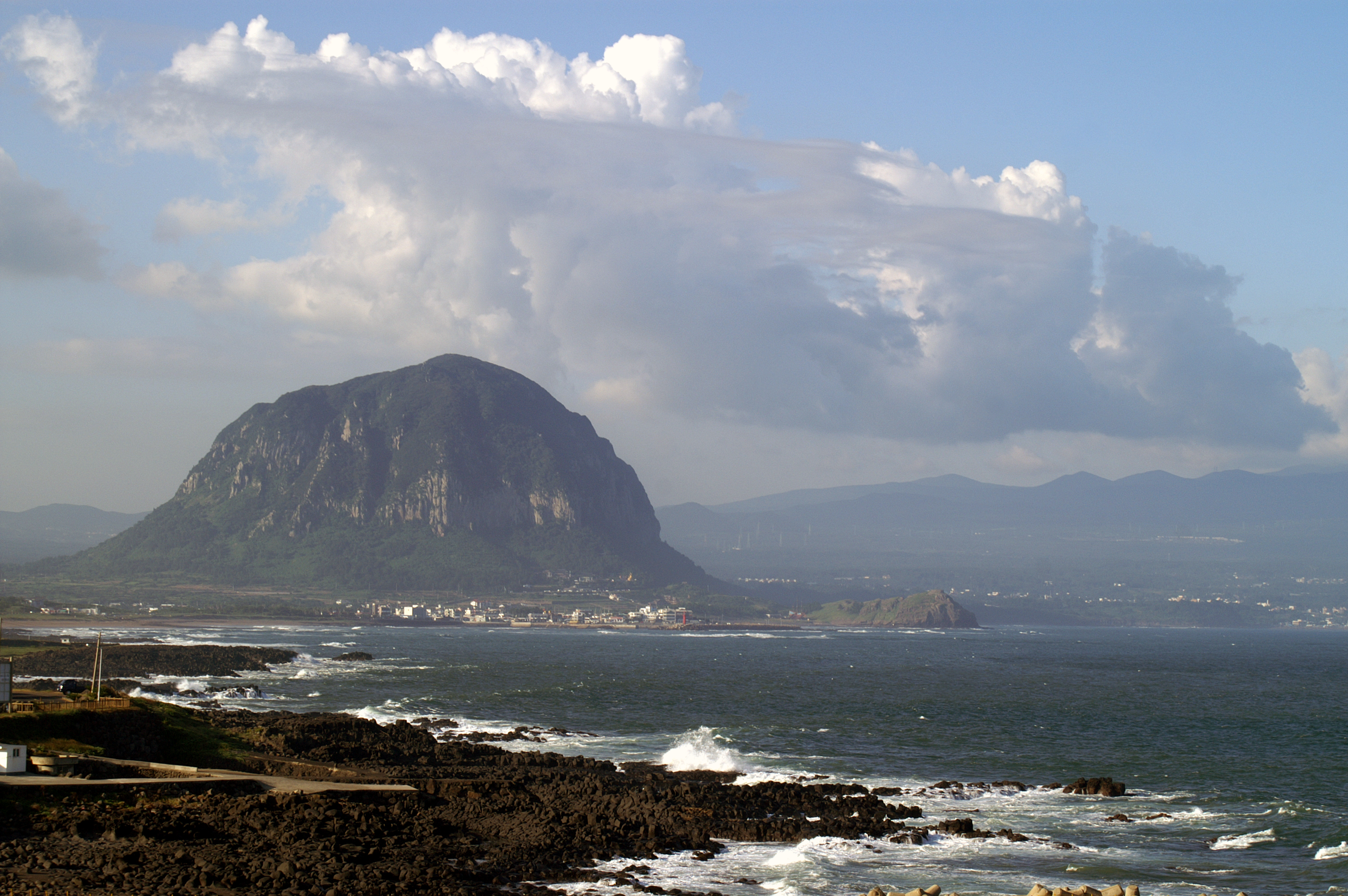
The mountain from a distance (2009)

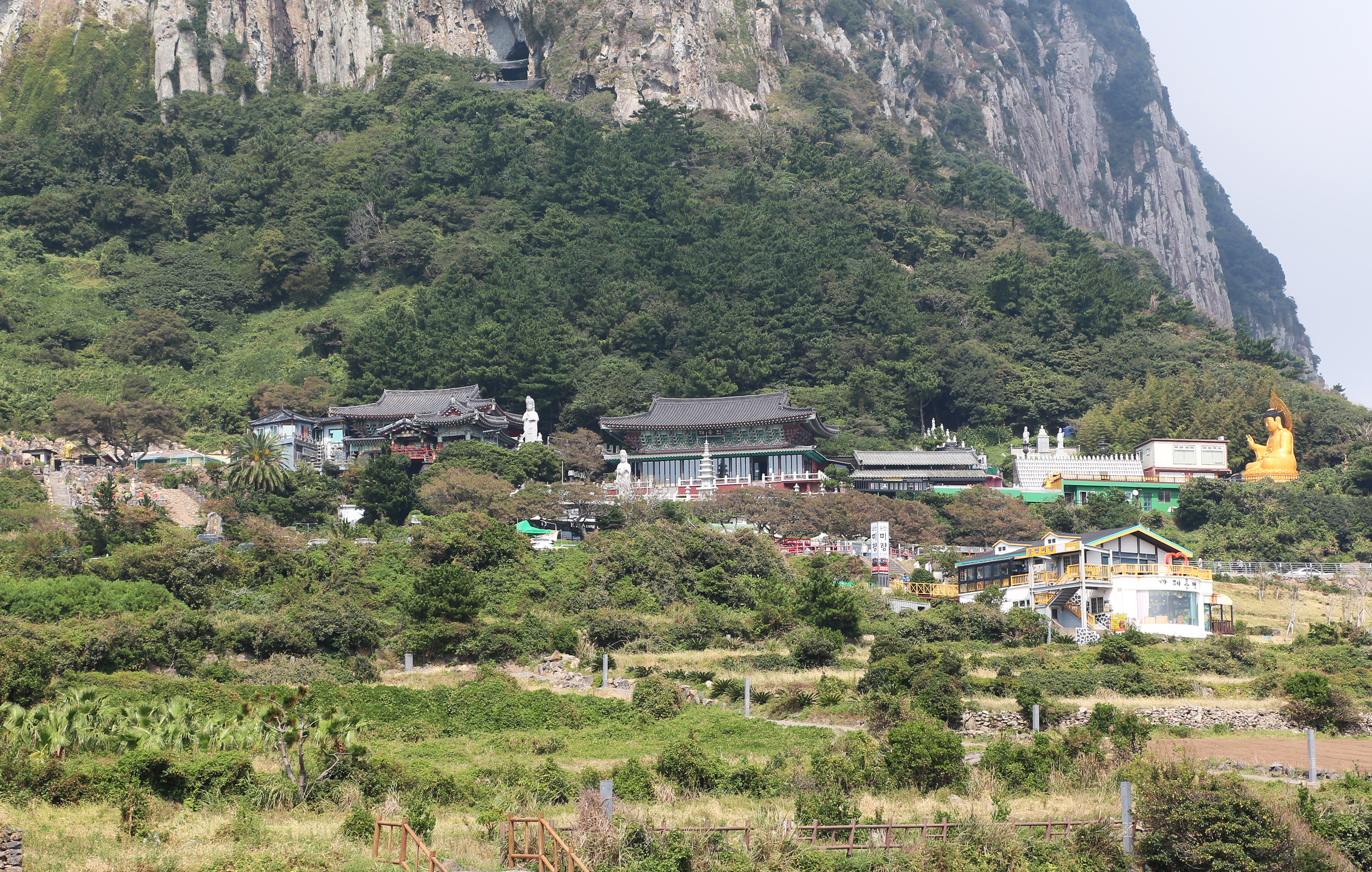
Bomunsa, on the slopes of the mountain (2022)

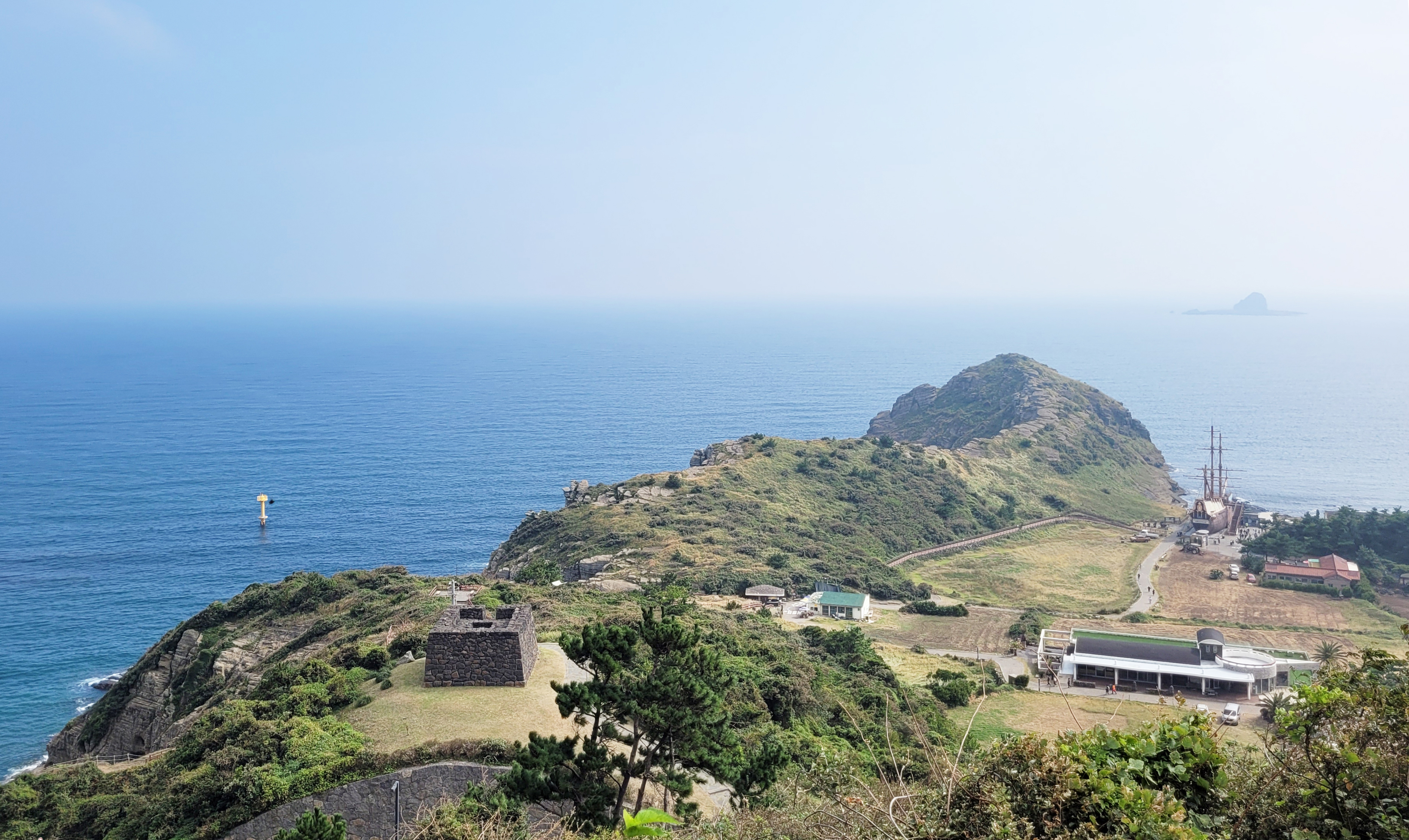
Yongmeori Coast, as seen from the mountain (2022)
