= Jeju Island =

Island of South Korea

Nickname: Sammudo ("Island of Three Lacks"), Samdado ("Island of Three Abundances")
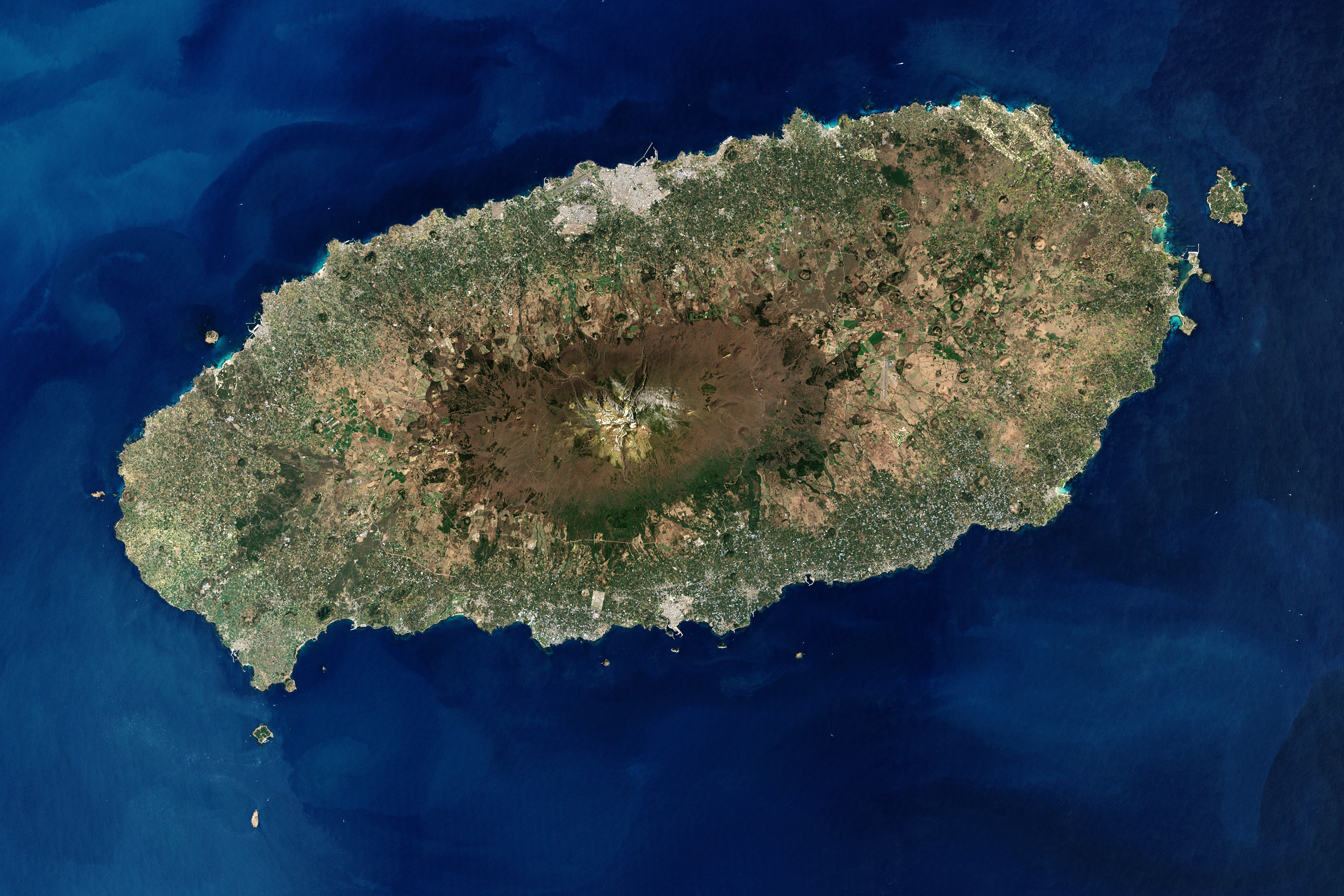
- Satellite image of Jeju Island

- Map of Jeju Island

- Location within South Korea

Geography
- Location: East Asia
- Coordinates: 33.38°N 126.53°E
- Archipelago: Jeju
- Area: 1,826 km^{2} (705 sq mi)
- Length: 73 km (45.4 mi)
- Width: 31 km (19.3 mi)
- Highest elevation: 1,950 m (6400 ft)
- Highest point: Hallasan

Administration
- South Korea
- Largest settlement: Jeju City (pop. 501,791)

Demographics
- Population: 665,953 (August 2025)
- Pop. density: 316/km^{2} (818/sq mi)
- Languages: Jeju, Korean
- Ethnic groups: Jejuans, Korean

Korean name
- Hangul: 제주도
- Hanja: 濟州島
- RR: Jejudo
- MR: Chejudo

Jeju Island (Jeju and Korean: 제주도; pronounced [tɕeːdʑudo]) is South Korea's largest island, covering an area of 1,833.2 km^{2} (707.8 sq mi), which is 1.83% of the total area of the country. Alongside outlying islands, it is part of Jeju Province and makes up the majority of the province.

The island lies in the Korea Strait, 82.8 km (51.4 mi) south of the nearest point on the Korean Peninsula. The Jeju people are indigenous to the island, and it has been populated by modern humans since the early Neolithic period. The Jeju language is considered critically endangered by UNESCO. It is also one of the regions of Korea where Shamanism is most intact.

Jeju Island has an oval shape and is 73 km (45 mi) east–west and 31 km (19 mi) north–south, with a gentle slope around Hallasan in the center. The length of the main road is 181 km (112 mi) and the coastline is 258 km (160 mi). On the northern end of Jeju Island is Gimnyeong Beach, on the southern end Songak Mountain, the western end Suwolbong, and the eastern end Seongsan Ilchulbong.

The island was formed by the eruption of a submarine volcano approximately 2 million years ago. It contains a natural World Heritage Site, the Jeju Volcanic Island and Lava Tubes. Jeju Island has a subtropical climate; even in winter, the temperature rarely falls below 0 °C (32 °F). Jeju is a popular holiday destination and a sizable portion of the economy relies on tourism and related economic activity.

== Historical names ==
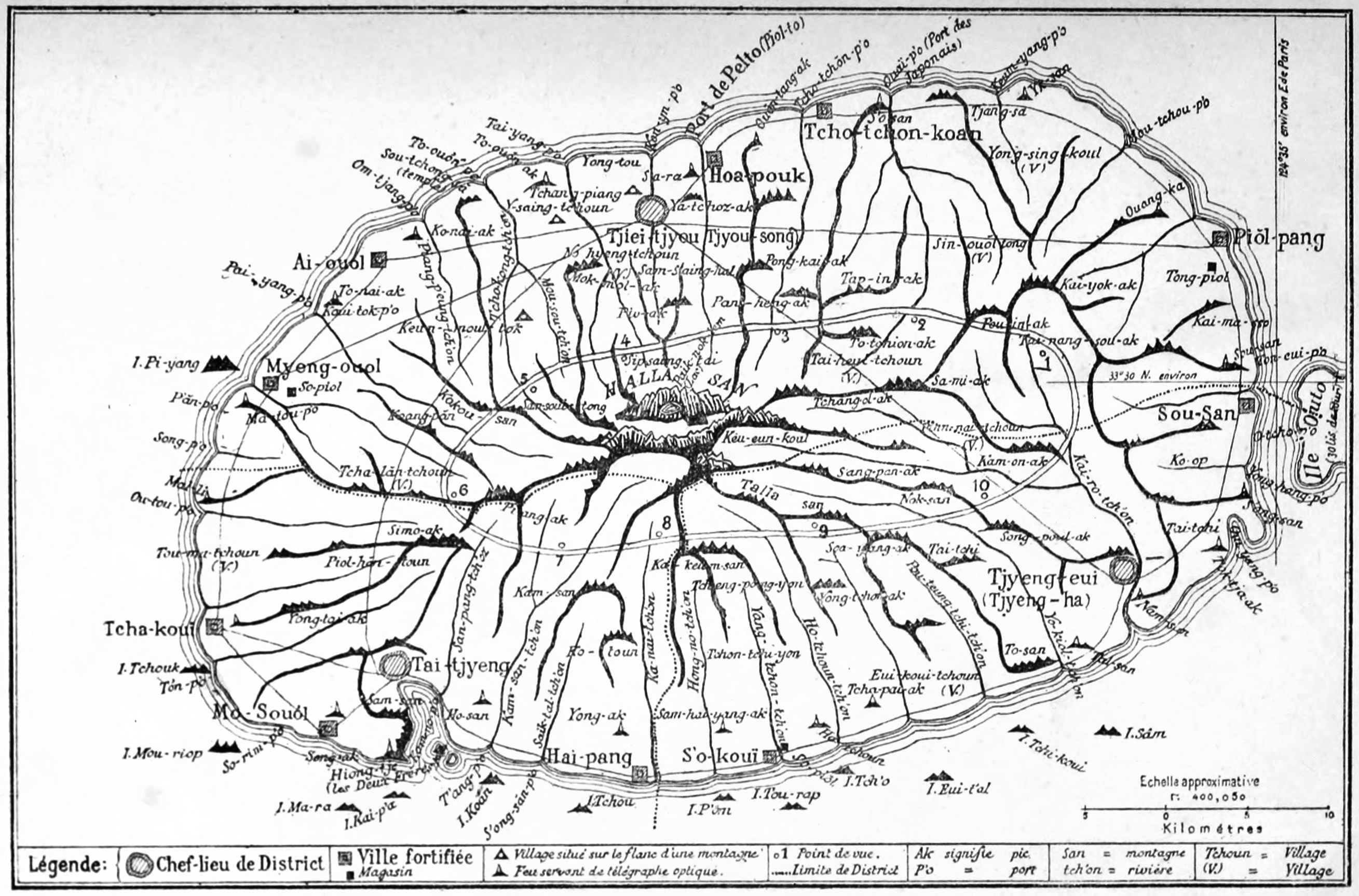
1894 map of Quelpaërt or Tchæ-Tchiou

Historically, the island has been called by many different names including:

- Doi (도이; 島夷; lit. 'Island barbarian')
- Dongyeongju (동영주; 東瀛州)
- Juho (주호; 州胡)
- Tammora (탐모라; 耽牟羅)
- Seomna (섭라; 涉羅)
- Tangna (탁나; 乇羅)
- Tamna (탐나; 耽羅)
- Quelpart, Quelparte or Quelpaert Island
- Junweonhado (준원하도; 준원下島, meaning "southern part of peninsula")
- Taekseungnido (택승니도, meaning "the peaceful hot island in Joseon")
- Samdado (삼다도; 三多島, meaning "Island of Three Abundances")
- Sammudo (삼무도; 三無島)
- Cheju (spelling until 7 July 2000)

Before the Japanese annexation in 1910, the island was usually known as Quelpart (Quelpaërt, Quelpaert) to Europeans; during the occupation it was known by the Japanese name Saishū. The name Quelpart coming from the French language is attested in Dutch no later than 1648 and may have denoted the first Dutch ship to spot the island, the quelpaert de Brack around 1642, or rather some visual similarity of the island from some angle to this class of ships (a small dispatch vessel, also called a galiot).

The first European explorers to sight the island, the Portuguese, called it Ilha de Ladrones (Island of Thieves, modern Portuguese Ladrões).

The name "Fungma island" appeared in the "Atlas of China" of M. Martini who arrived in China as a missionary in 1655.

== Landscape ==
Jeju is a volcanic island, dominated by Hallasan: a volcano 1,947 metres (6,388 ft) high and the highest mountain in South Korea. The island measures approximately 73 kilometres (45 mi) across, east to west, and 41 kilometres (25 mi) from north to south. The island also has around 360 oreum: small extinct volcanoes or parasitic cones. Many of these are now popular tourist attractions, such as Geomunoreum, Yongnuni Oreum, and Geum Oreum.

The island formed by volcanic eruptions approximately two million years ago, during the Pleistocene epoch. The island consists chiefly of basalt and lava.

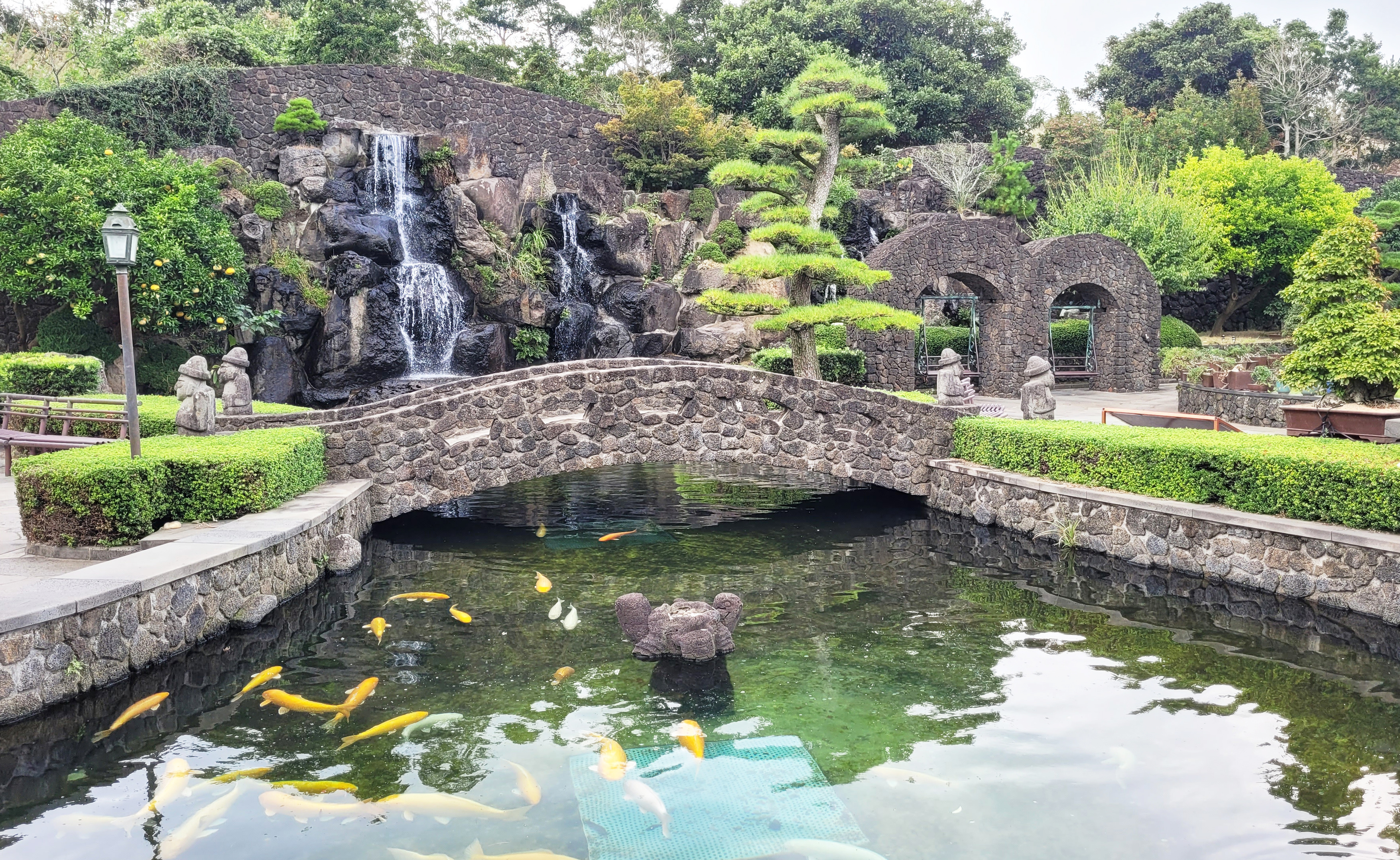
Spirited Garden in Jeju Island

An area covering about 12% (224 square kilometres or 86 square miles) of Jeju Island is called gotjawal, a local term for forests. This area remained uncultivated until the 21st century, as its base of 'a'a lava made it difficult to develop for agriculture. Because this forest remained pristine for so long, it has a unique ecology.

The forest is the main source of groundwater and thus the main water source for the half million people of the island, because rainwater penetrates directly into the aquifer through the cracks of the 'a'a lava under the forest. Gotjawal forest is considered an internationally important wetland under the Ramsar Convention by some researchers because it is the habitat of unique species of plants and is the main source of water for the residents, although to date it has not been declared a Ramsar site.

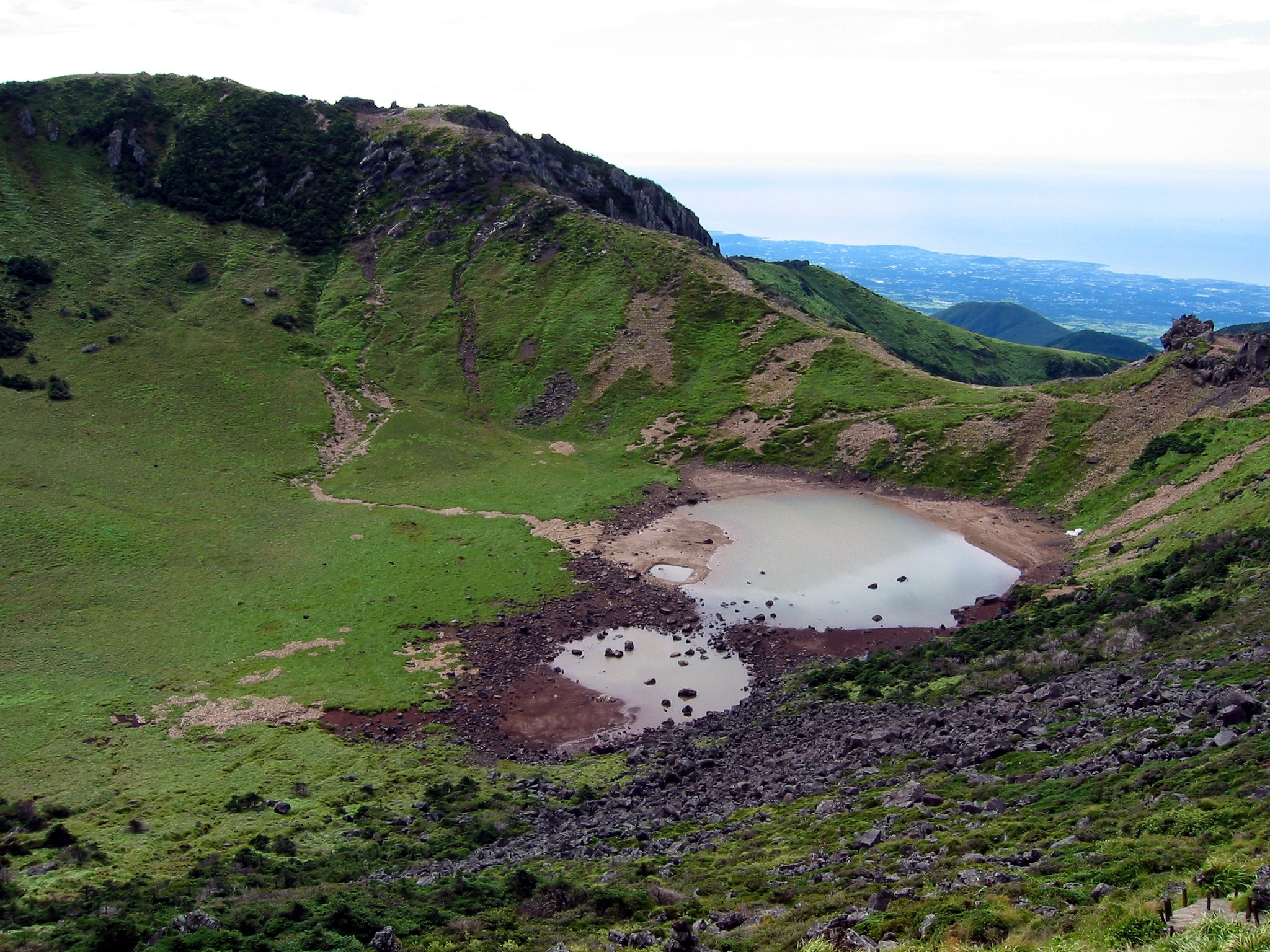
Baengnokdam in Hallasan

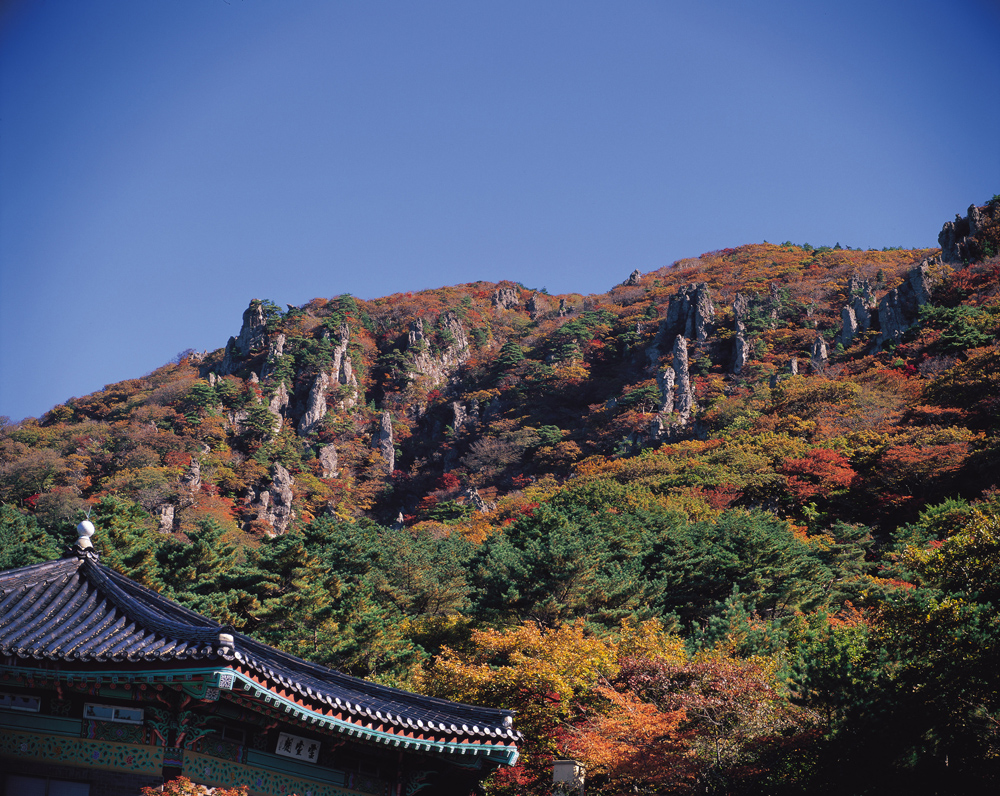
Mountains in Jeju

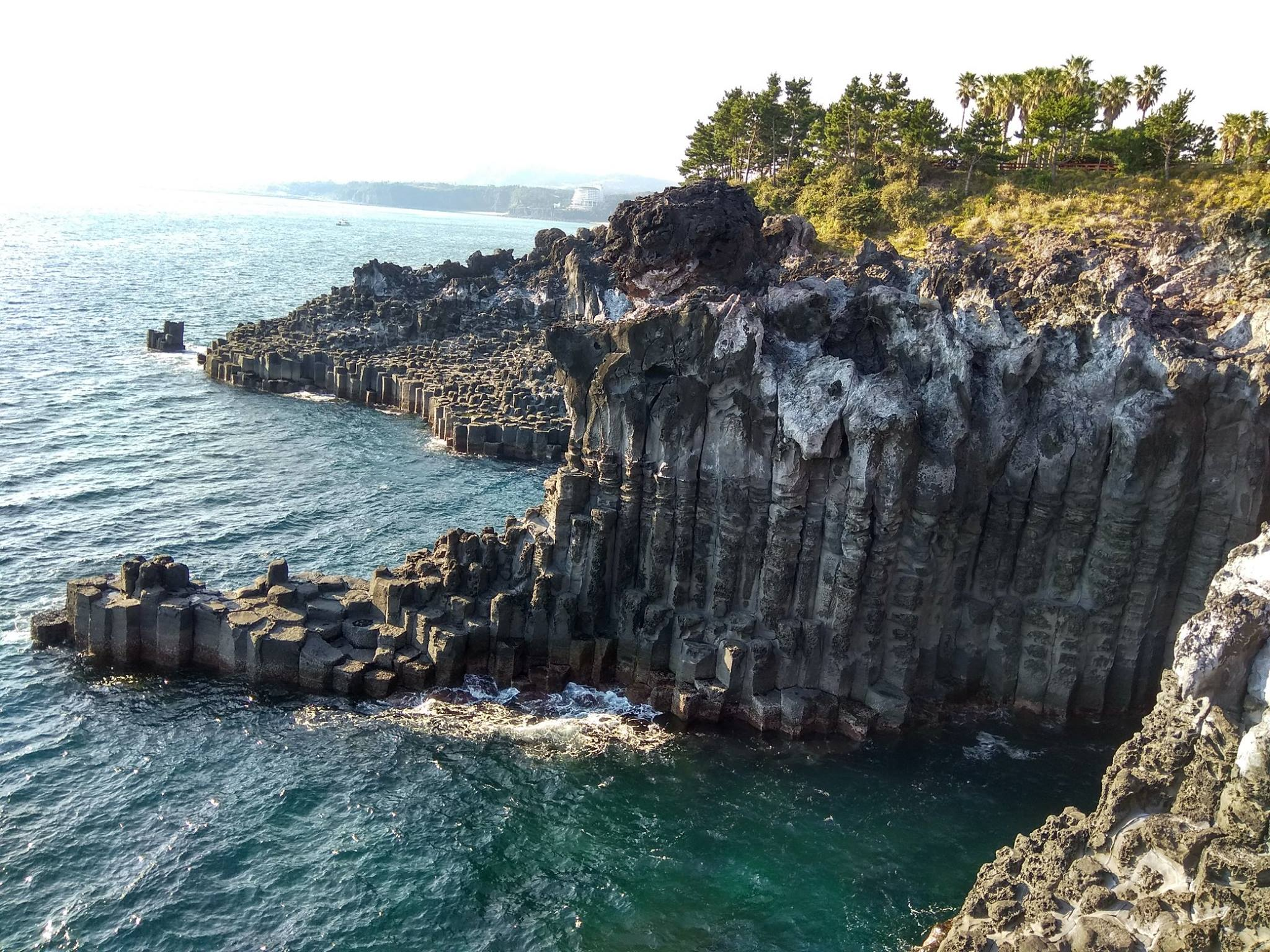
Daepo Jusangjeolli Cliff

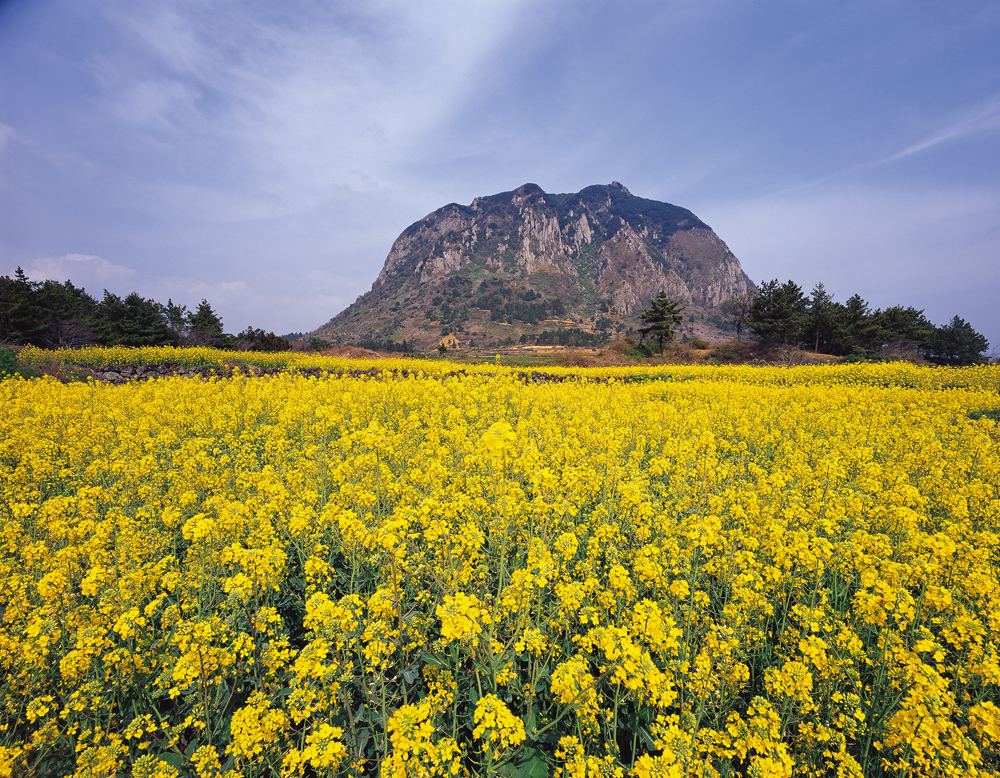
Sanbangsan

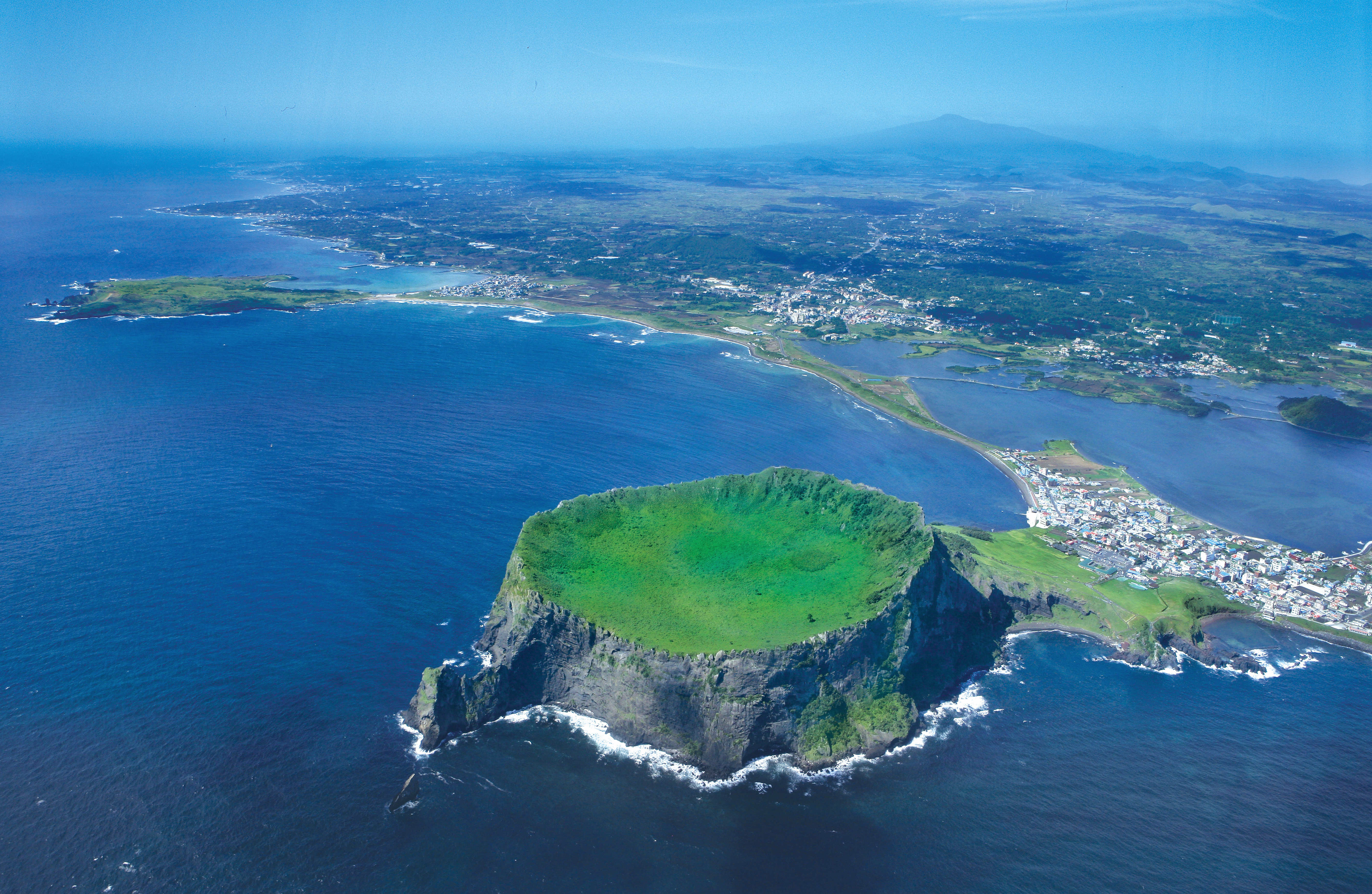
Seongsan Ilchulbong

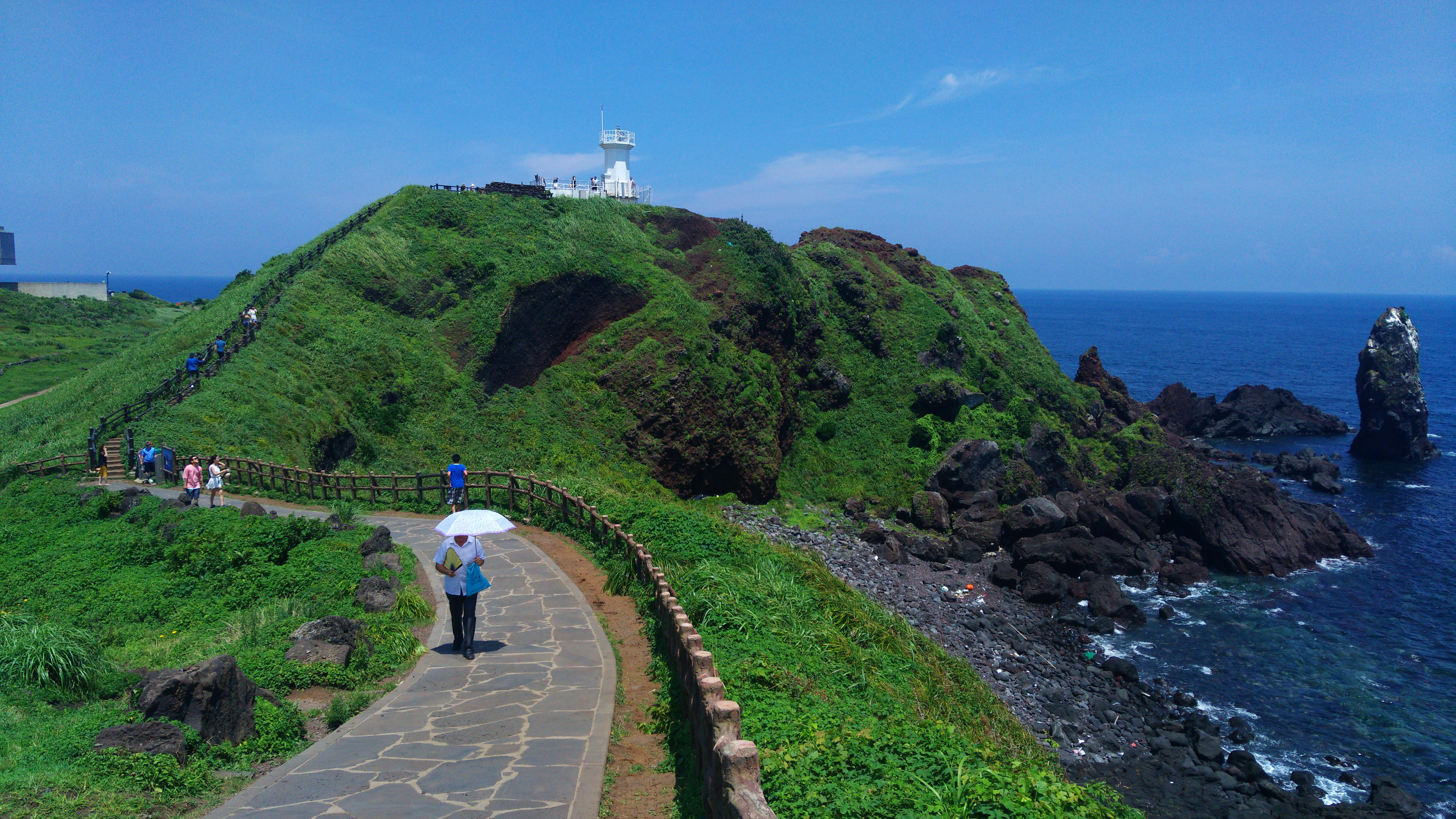
Seopjikoji (섭지코지)

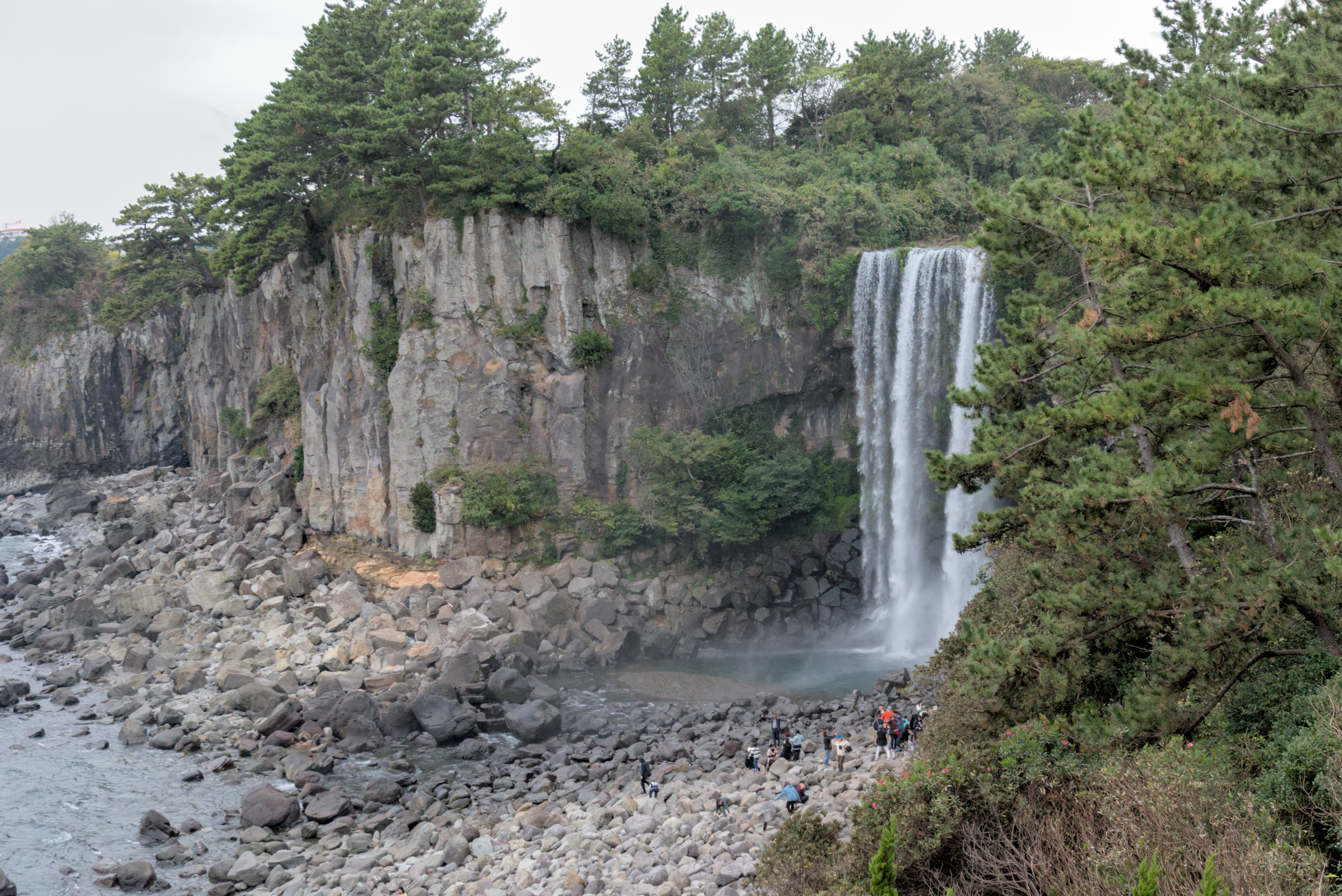
Jeongbang Waterfall

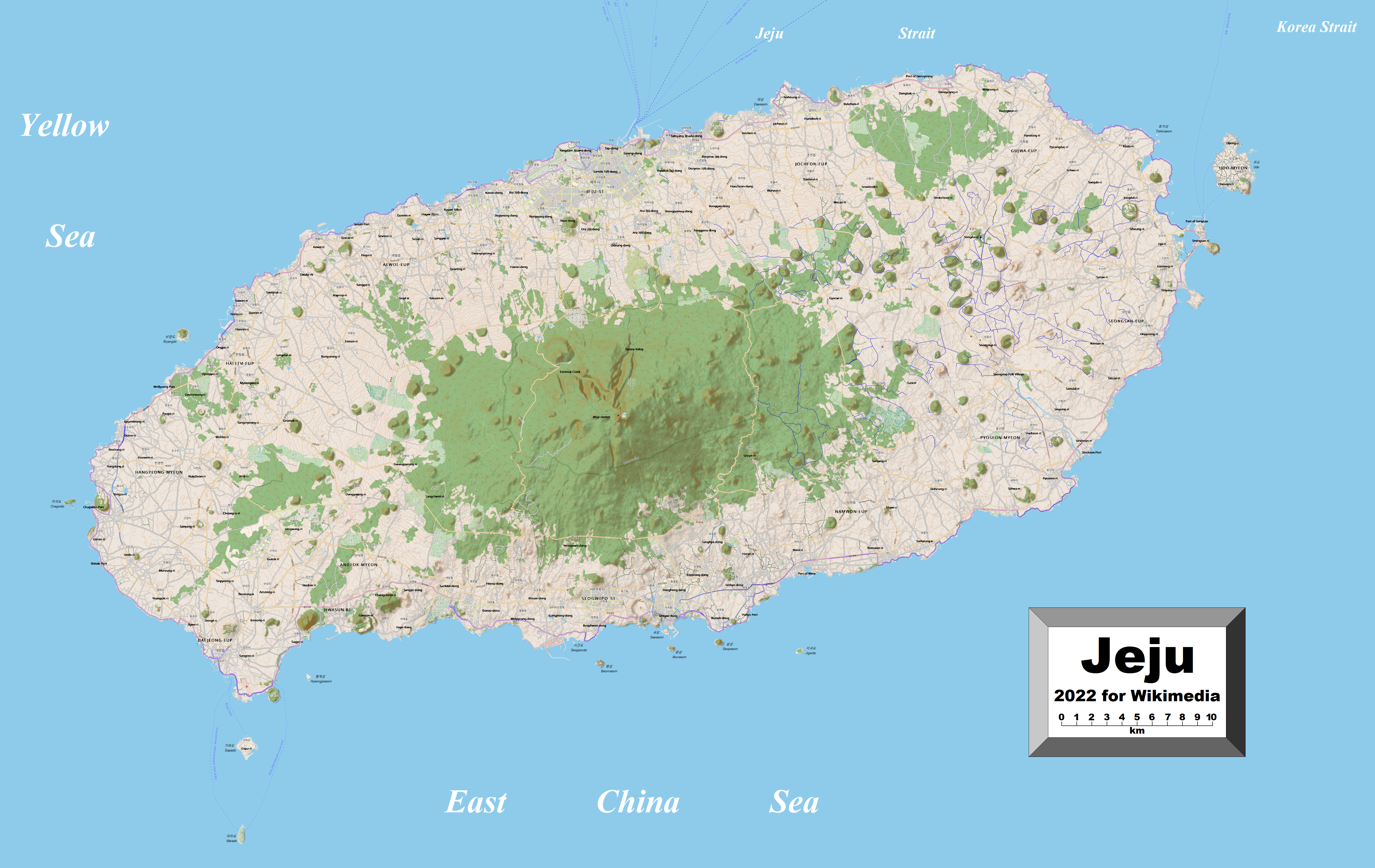
Detailed map of Jeju Island

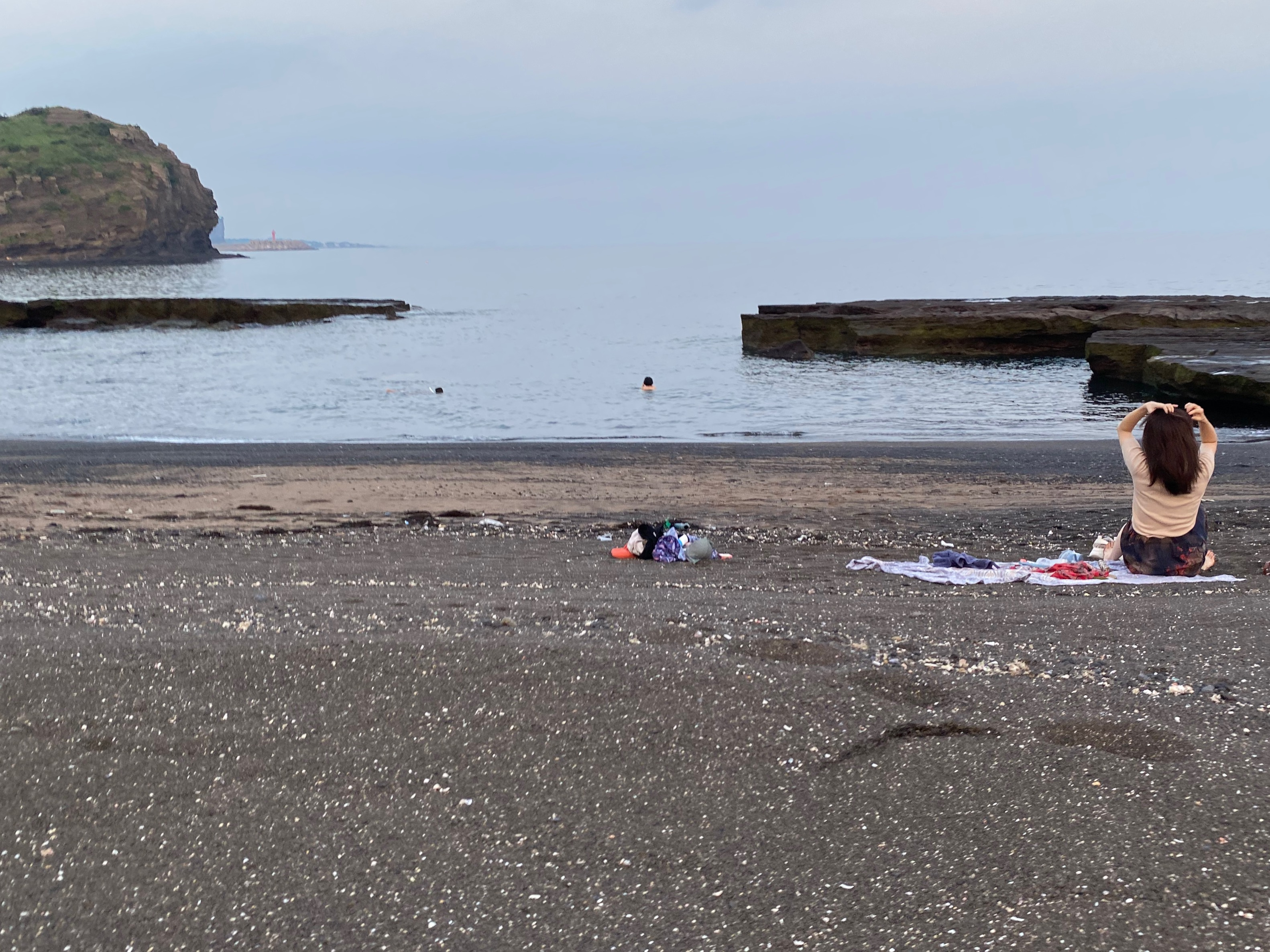
A black sand beach in south-western Jeju

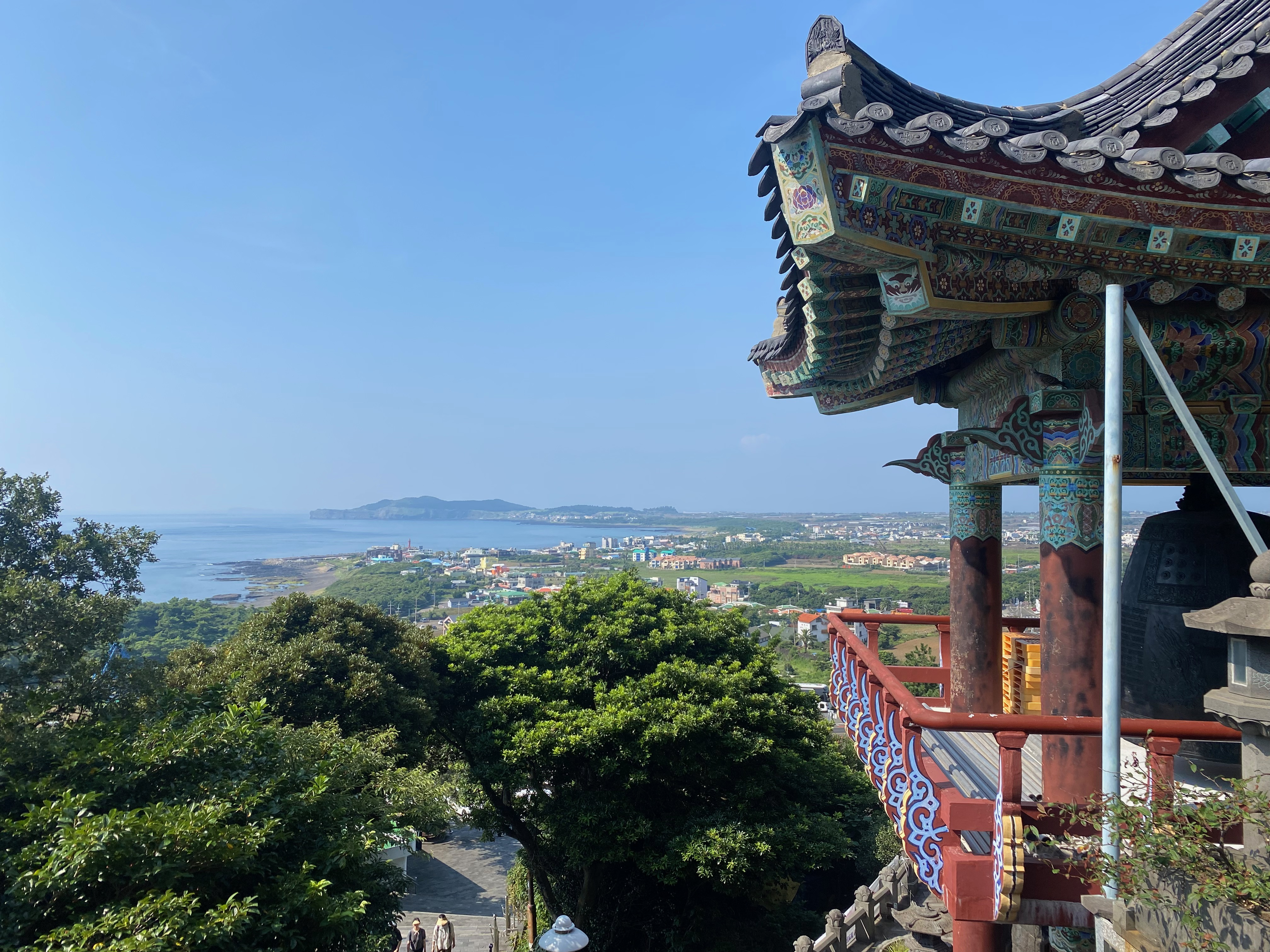
View from Bomunsa temple

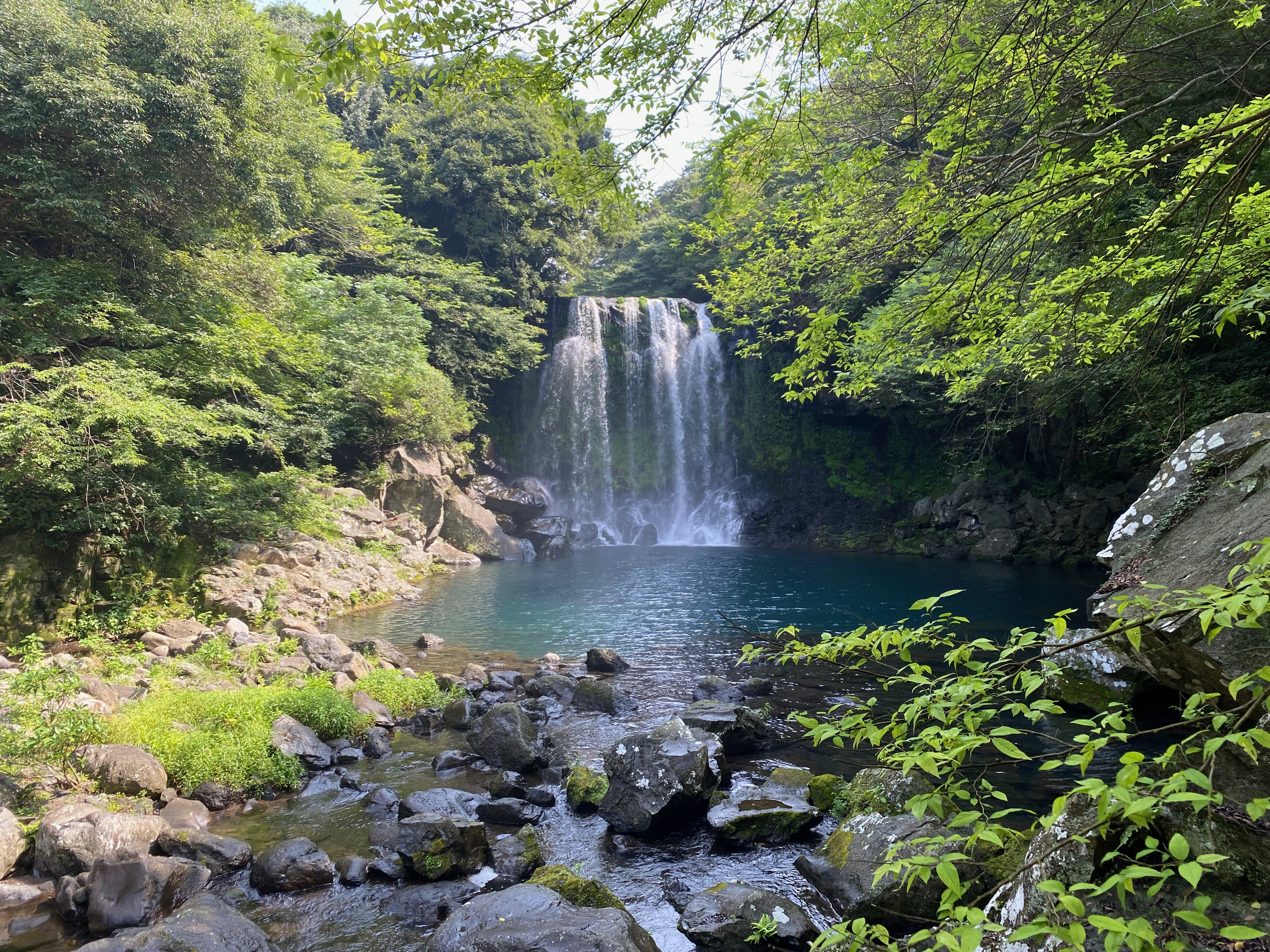
Cheonjiyeon waterfall in Seogwipo

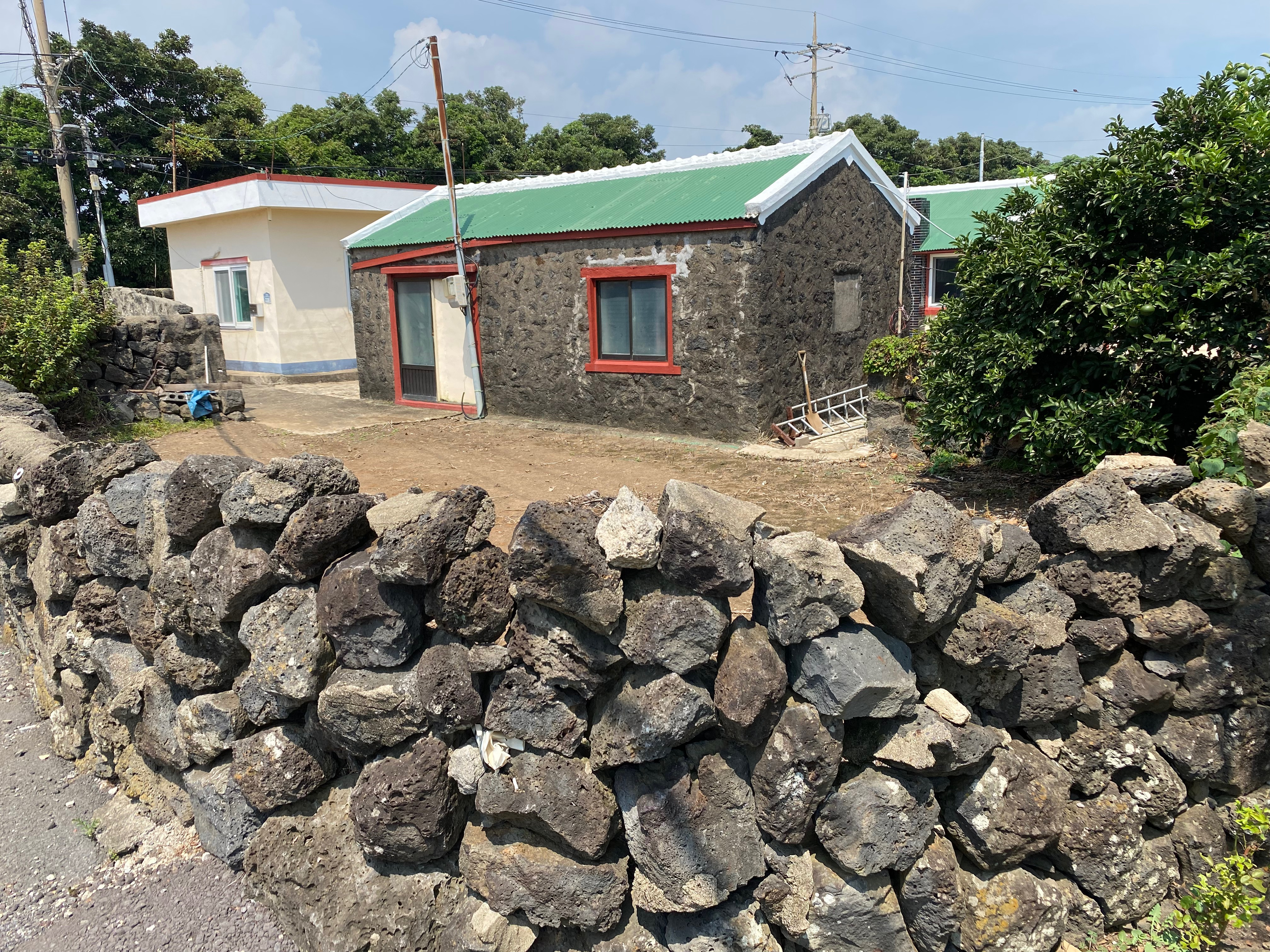
The island's volcanic basalt rock was traditionally used as a building material

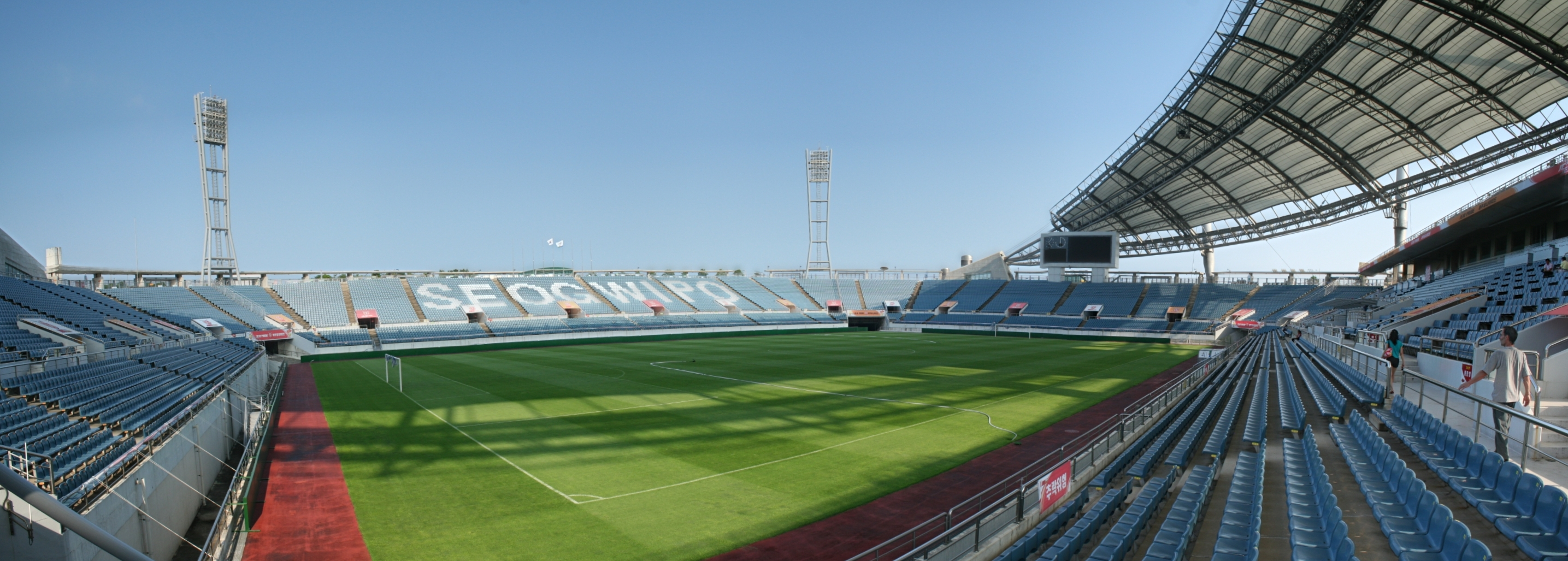
Jeju World Cup Stadium.

== Formation ==
- About 2 million years ago, the island of Jeju was formed through volcanic activity.
- About 1.2 million years ago, a magma chamber formed under the sea floor and began to erupt.
- About 700 thousand years ago, the island had been formed through volcanic activity. Volcanic activity then stopped for approximately 100 thousand years.
- About 300 thousand years ago, volcanic activity restarted along the coastline.
- About 100 thousand years ago, volcanic activity formed Hallasan Mountain.
- About 25 thousand years ago, lateral eruptions around Hallasan Mountain left multiple oreum (smaller 'parasitic' cones on the flanks of the primary cone).
- Volcanic activity that stopped and prolonged weathering and erosion helped shape the island.

== Climate ==
Most of Jeju Island has a humid subtropical climate (Cfa in the Köppen climate classification). Four distinct seasons are experienced in Jeju: winters are cool with moderate rainfall, while summers are hot and humid with very high rainfall.

Jeju City, the northern part of the island, tends to be colder in winter than the southern part due to the influence of continental seasonal winds. Gosan-ri, located on the west side of the island, has the lowest annual average precipitation on the island. However, unlike most parts of mainland Korea, the seasonal precipitation in Gosan-ri is evenly distributed. The Chuja Islands, which belong to Jeju City, are an archipelago located between mainland Korea and Jeju Island and also have a humid subtropical climate (Cfa).

Climate data for Ildo 1-dong, Jeju City (1991–2020 normals, extremes 1923–present)
Month	Jan	Feb	Mar	Apr	May	Jun	Jul	Aug	Sep	Oct	Nov	Dec	Year
Record high °C (°F)	23.6 (74.5)	24.5 (76.1)	28.8 (83.8)	30.9 (87.6)	33.1 (91.6)	34.5 (94.1)	37.5 (99.5)	37.5 (99.5)	35.1 (95.2)	32.1 (89.8)	26.7 (80.1)	23.3 (73.9)	37.5 (99.5)
Mean daily maximum °C (°F)	8.6 (47.5)	9.9 (49.8)	13.3 (55.9)	18.0 (64.4)	22.1 (71.8)	24.9 (76.8)	29.3 (84.7)	30.1 (86.2)	26.1 (79.0)	21.6 (70.9)	16.4 (61.5)	11.0 (51.8)	19.3 (66.7)
Daily mean °C (°F)	6.1 (43.0)	6.8 (44.2)	9.8 (49.6)	14.2 (57.6)	18.3 (64.9)	21.7 (71.1)	26.2 (79.2)	27.2 (81.0)	23.3 (73.9)	18.6 (65.5)	13.3 (55.9)	8.3 (46.9)	16.2 (61.2)
Mean daily minimum °C (°F)	3.7 (38.7)	4.0 (39.2)	6.6 (43.9)	10.8 (51.4)	15.0 (59.0)	19.1 (66.4)	23.7 (74.7)	24.8 (76.6)	20.9 (69.6)	15.7 (60.3)	10.4 (50.7)	5.6 (42.1)	13.4 (56.1)
Record low °C (°F)	−5.8 (21.6)	−6.0 (21.2)	−4.1 (24.6)	−0.2 (31.6)	4.0 (39.2)	9.2 (48.6)	15.0 (59.0)	15.8 (60.4)	9.8 (49.6)	5.5 (41.9)	0.5 (32.9)	−3.6 (25.5)	−6.0 (21.2)
Average precipitation mm (inches)	67.5 (2.66)	57.2 (2.25)	90.6 (3.57)	89.7 (3.53)	95.6 (3.76)	171.2 (6.74)	210.2 (8.28)	272.3 (10.72)	227.8 (8.97)	95.1 (3.74)	69.5 (2.74)	55.6 (2.19)	1,502.3 (59.15)
Average precipitation days (≥ 0.1 mm)	12.2	10.2	10.3	9.4	9.8	11.7	11.8	13.2	11.2	6.7	9.8	11.5	127.8
Average snowy days	7.2	4.2	1.0	0.0	0.0	0.0	0.0	0.0	0.0	0.0	0.4	5.3	18.1
Average relative humidity (%)	64.0	63.3	63.2	64.8	68.4	77.9	78.3	76.2	73.7	66.4	65.0	64.1	68.8
Mean monthly sunshine hours	70.2	110.0	166.0	196.5	212.2	159.7	189.8	195.1	158.9	173.3	123.7	79.1	1,834.5
Percentage possible sunshine	22.2	34.0	42.8	49.8	49.2	39.7	44.7	47.2	43.5	50.7	40.2	27.4	41.7
Source: Korea Meteorological Administration (percent sunshine 1981–2010)

Climate data for Gosan-ri, Hangyeong-myeon, Jeju City (1991–2020 normals, extremes 1988–present)
Month	Jan	Feb	Mar	Apr	May	Jun	Jul	Aug	Sep	Oct	Nov	Dec	Year
Record high °C (°F)	18.8 (65.8)	20.1 (68.2)	21.4 (70.5)	27.3 (81.1)	27.5 (81.5)	29.6 (85.3)	34.3 (93.7)	35.5 (95.9)	32.5 (90.5)	30.3 (86.5)	26.8 (80.2)	21.9 (71.4)	35.5 (95.9)
Mean daily maximum °C (°F)	8.4 (47.1)	9.4 (48.9)	12.5 (54.5)	16.7 (62.1)	20.4 (68.7)	23.7 (74.7)	27.4 (81.3)	29.3 (84.7)	26.1 (79.0)	21.4 (70.5)	16.4 (61.5)	11.0 (51.8)	18.6 (65.5)
Daily mean °C (°F)	6.1 (43.0)	6.6 (43.9)	9.4 (48.9)	13.4 (56.1)	17.1 (62.8)	20.7 (69.3)	24.9 (76.8)	26.4 (79.5)	23.0 (73.4)	18.5 (65.3)	13.5 (56.3)	8.5 (47.3)	15.7 (60.3)
Mean daily minimum °C (°F)	3.8 (38.8)	4.1 (39.4)	6.5 (43.7)	10.5 (50.9)	14.3 (57.7)	18.4 (65.1)	22.9 (73.2)	24.1 (75.4)	20.6 (69.1)	15.9 (60.6)	10.9 (51.6)	5.9 (42.6)	13.2 (55.8)
Record low °C (°F)	−6.2 (20.8)	−3.0 (26.6)	−2.3 (27.9)	3.3 (37.9)	9.2 (48.6)	12.7 (54.9)	16.8 (62.2)	17.1 (62.8)	14.8 (58.6)	7.3 (45.1)	0.8 (33.4)	−2.0 (28.4)	−6.2 (20.8)
Average precipitation mm (inches)	40.6 (1.60)	47.8 (1.88)	76.2 (3.00)	94.7 (3.73)	117.7 (4.63)	158.1 (6.22)	167.7 (6.60)	201.9 (7.95)	120.4 (4.74)	56.9 (2.24)	60.2 (2.37)	40.7 (1.60)	1,182.9 (46.57)
Average precipitation days (≥ 0.1 mm)	10.6	9.0	10.2	9.0	9.6	11.3	11.3	13.1	9.6	6.3	8.6	10.4	119
Average snowy days	5.9	3.0	1.3	0.0	0.0	0.0	0.0	0.0	0.0	0.0	0.3	4.0	14.5
Average relative humidity (%)	66.9	68.0	69.9	74.2	80.2	86.2	89.2	83.9	77.8	69.7	67.9	66.5	75.0
Mean monthly sunshine hours	95.4	131.0	175.4	196.3	205.3	156.0	172.6	219.7	187.4	206.6	150.7	106.3	2,002.7
Percentage possible sunshine	28.7	40.7	45.0	50.3	46.9	36.8	40.4	52.0	50.5	58.8	48.9	34.9	44.7
Source: Korea Meteorological Administration (snow and percent sunshine 1981–2010)

Climate data for Chuja Islands, Jeju City (1993–2020 normals)
Month	Jan	Feb	Mar	Apr	May	Jun	Jul	Aug	Sep	Oct	Nov	Dec	Year
Mean daily maximum °C (°F)	7.2 (45.0)	8.4 (47.1)	11.5 (52.7)	15.6 (60.1)	19.4 (66.9)	22.8 (73.0)	26.8 (80.2)	28.9 (84.0)	25.5 (77.9)	21.0 (69.8)	15.3 (59.5)	9.7 (49.5)	17.7 (63.9)
Daily mean °C (°F)	5.0 (41.0)	5.7 (42.3)	8.6 (47.5)	12.5 (54.5)	16.3 (61.3)	19.9 (67.8)	24.3 (75.7)	26.2 (79.2)	22.9 (73.2)	18.4 (65.1)	12.8 (55.0)	7.5 (45.5)	15.0 (59.0)
Mean daily minimum °C (°F)	2.8 (37.0)	3.3 (37.9)	6.0 (42.8)	10.0 (50.0)	13.9 (57.0)	17.8 (64.0)	22.2 (72.0)	24.2 (75.6)	21.1 (70.0)	16.4 (61.5)	10.6 (51.1)	5.1 (41.2)	12.8 (55.0)
Average precipitation mm (inches)	27.2 (1.07)	40.3 (1.59)	73.0 (2.87)	79.6 (3.13)	92.5 (3.64)	152.7 (6.01)	190.3 (7.49)	201.8 (7.94)	132.9 (5.23)	57.9 (2.28)	46.6 (1.83)	32.9 (1.30)	1,127.7 (44.40)
Average precipitation days (≥ 0.1 mm)	5.9	5.5	7.0	7.7	7.8	8.8	9.1	8.5	6.9	4.6	5.9	7.4	85.1
Source: Korea Meteorological Administration

Seogwipo, the southern part of the island, is relatively warmer in winter than Jeju City because Hallasan in the middle of the island blocks continental seasonal winds. Downtown Seogwipo has the highest average temperature in January in Korea, even compared to mainland Korea. Seongsan-eup, on the southeastern side of the island, is directly affected by both the East Asian monsoon and the Tsushima Current, so annual precipitation is very high. Seogwipo is one of the regions with the highest annual precipitation in Korea.

Climate data for Jeongbang-dong, Seogwipo (1991–2020 normals, extremes 1961–present)
Month	Jan	Feb	Mar	Apr	May	Jun	Jul	Aug	Sep	Oct	Nov	Dec	Year
Record high °C (°F)	20.7 (69.3)	23.6 (74.5)	23.8 (74.8)	28.5 (83.3)	30.4 (86.7)	31.5 (88.7)	35.8 (96.4)	35.9 (96.6)	34.8 (94.6)	31.7 (89.1)	28.0 (82.4)	21.9 (71.4)	35.9 (96.6)
Mean daily maximum °C (°F)	10.8 (51.4)	11.8 (53.2)	14.7 (58.5)	18.6 (65.5)	22.3 (72.1)	24.7 (76.5)	28.3 (82.9)	30.1 (86.2)	27.4 (81.3)	23.5 (74.3)	18.4 (65.1)	13.1 (55.6)	20.3 (68.5)
Daily mean °C (°F)	7.2 (45.0)	8.2 (46.8)	11.0 (51.8)	15.0 (59.0)	18.8 (65.8)	21.8 (71.2)	25.7 (78.3)	27.2 (81.0)	24.1 (75.4)	19.6 (67.3)	14.6 (58.3)	9.4 (48.9)	16.9 (62.4)
Mean daily minimum °C (°F)	4.1 (39.4)	4.8 (40.6)	7.5 (45.5)	11.6 (52.9)	15.8 (60.4)	19.5 (67.1)	23.8 (74.8)	24.9 (76.8)	21.5 (70.7)	16.4 (61.5)	11.2 (52.2)	6.2 (43.2)	13.9 (57.0)
Record low °C (°F)	−6.4 (20.5)	−6.3 (20.7)	−4.4 (24.1)	0.2 (32.4)	7.2 (45.0)	11.9 (53.4)	14.8 (58.6)	16.8 (62.2)	12.2 (54.0)	6.8 (44.2)	0.0 (32.0)	−4.1 (24.6)	−6.4 (20.5)
Average precipitation mm (inches)	60.7 (2.39)	77.9 (3.07)	130.3 (5.13)	187.0 (7.36)	223.6 (8.80)	267.6 (10.54)	275.8 (10.86)	315.7 (12.43)	208.8 (8.22)	100.4 (3.95)	86.2 (3.39)	55.6 (2.19)	1,989.6 (78.33)
Average precipitation days (≥ 0.1 mm)	9.8	9.6	10.5	10.1	10.7	12.8	13.8	14.3	10.9	5.8	8.1	8.9	125.3
Average snowy days	3.8	2.4	0.8	0.0	0.0	0.0	0.0	0.0	0.0	0.0	0.1	3.1	10.2
Average relative humidity (%)	63.0	62.5	62.4	65.2	70.6	80.7	86.1	80.9	73.6	64.8	64.7	63.2	69.8
Mean monthly sunshine hours	153.5	157.4	185.8	196.5	203.5	136.3	144.8	187.7	174.7	208.8	166.8	158.8	2,074.6
Percentage possible sunshine	48.0	49.2	46.9	48.9	46.3	33.6	32.5	44.5	47.4	58.8	54.3	52.1	46.2
Source: Korea Meteorological Administration (percent sunshine 1981–2010)

Climate data for Seongsan-eup, Seogwipo (1991–2020 normals, extremes 1971–present)
Month	Jan	Feb	Mar	Apr	May	Jun	Jul	Aug	Sep	Oct	Nov	Dec	Year
Record high °C (°F)	20.9 (69.6)	22.3 (72.1)	22.7 (72.9)	28.1 (82.6)	30.6 (87.1)	31.8 (89.2)	36.2 (97.2)	35.5 (95.9)	33.3 (91.9)	30.1 (86.2)	25.7 (78.3)	22.1 (71.8)	36.2 (97.2)
Mean daily maximum °C (°F)	8.9 (48.0)	10.1 (50.2)	13.6 (56.5)	18.0 (64.4)	21.9 (71.4)	24.2 (75.6)	28.1 (82.6)	29.7 (85.5)	26.5 (79.7)	22.0 (71.6)	16.7 (62.1)	11.2 (52.2)	19.2 (66.6)
Daily mean °C (°F)	5.4 (41.7)	6.3 (43.3)	9.5 (49.1)	13.8 (56.8)	17.7 (63.9)	20.9 (69.6)	25.1 (77.2)	26.5 (79.7)	23.2 (73.8)	18.2 (64.8)	12.7 (54.9)	7.5 (45.5)	15.6 (60.1)
Mean daily minimum °C (°F)	2.1 (35.8)	2.5 (36.5)	5.2 (41.4)	9.4 (48.9)	13.7 (56.7)	17.9 (64.2)	22.6 (72.7)	23.9 (75.0)	20.2 (68.4)	14.5 (58.1)	8.8 (47.8)	3.9 (39.0)	12.1 (53.8)
Record low °C (°F)	−7.0 (19.4)	−6.4 (20.5)	−4.7 (23.5)	−1.3 (29.7)	1.7 (35.1)	8.2 (46.8)	13.7 (56.7)	16.2 (61.2)	10.4 (50.7)	3.2 (37.8)	−0.6 (30.9)	−4.0 (24.8)	−7.0 (19.4)
Average precipitation mm (inches)	77.5 (3.05)	83.2 (3.28)	139.4 (5.49)	161.3 (6.35)	178.0 (7.01)	231.9 (9.13)	271.3 (10.68)	343.2 (13.51)	248.6 (9.79)	114.0 (4.49)	102.8 (4.05)	78.8 (3.10)	2,030 (79.92)
Average precipitation days (≥ 0.1 mm)	11.0	9.8	10.4	9.4	9.8	12.8	12.7	13.3	10.8	6.3	9.0	10.1	125.4
Average snowy days	6.1	3.7	0.7	0.1	0.0	0.0	0.0	0.0	0.0	0.0	0.2	3.8	14.6
Average relative humidity (%)	67.4	65.5	65.4	67.4	72.2	82.6	85.6	81.5	76.3	69.4	68.7	67.7	72.5
Mean monthly sunshine hours	128.6	145.5	181.5	198.0	208.7	141.1	160.3	192.6	167.2	192.0	156.7	134.7	2,006.9
Percentage possible sunshine	38.7	47.3	45.8	49.4	47.7	33.8	35.9	44.0	44.5	55.0	49.6	42.1	44.2
Source: Korea Meteorological Administration (snow and percent sunshine 1981–2010)

The climate of the highlands in the middle of the island where Hallasan is located is quite different from that of the rest of the island. As the altitude increases, the average temperature decreases and the climate becomes colder. The highlands of Jeju Island have the highest annual precipitation in Korea.

Climate data for Seongpanak, Hallasan (elevation 760 m (2,490 ft), 1999–2020 normals)
Month	Jan	Feb	Mar	Apr	May	Jun	Jul	Aug	Sep	Oct	Nov	Dec	Year
Mean daily maximum °C (°F)	2.8 (37.0)	4.7 (40.5)	9.0 (48.2)	14.5 (58.1)	18.9 (66.0)	21.4 (70.5)	24.7 (76.5)	24.7 (76.5)	21.1 (70.0)	16.6 (61.9)	11.2 (52.2)	5.2 (41.4)	14.6 (58.3)
Daily mean °C (°F)	−0.4 (31.3)	1.0 (33.8)	4.9 (40.8)	10.2 (50.4)	14.7 (58.5)	17.7 (63.9)	21.4 (70.5)	21.6 (70.9)	17.8 (64.0)	12.8 (55.0)	7.4 (45.3)	1.9 (35.4)	10.9 (51.6)
Mean daily minimum °C (°F)	−3.1 (26.4)	−2.3 (27.9)	0.9 (33.6)	5.9 (42.6)	10.6 (51.1)	14.3 (57.7)	18.5 (65.3)	18.9 (66.0)	15.0 (59.0)	9.3 (48.7)	4.0 (39.2)	−1.0 (30.2)	7.6 (45.7)
Average precipitation mm (inches)	137.1 (5.40)	182.4 (7.18)	258.8 (10.19)	414.9 (16.33)	465.9 (18.34)	451.7 (17.78)	583.9 (22.99)	717.0 (28.23)	581.1 (22.88)	237.2 (9.34)	197.5 (7.78)	153.5 (6.04)	4,381 (172.48)
Average precipitation days (≥ 0.1 mm)	13.0	11.5	11.0	10.8	11.1	14.1	17.8	18.7	15.6	9.2	11.6	13.4	157.8
Source: Korea Meteorological Administration

Climate data for Witse Oreum, Hallasan (elevation 1,673 m (5,489 ft), 2003–2009 normals)
Month	Jan	Feb	Mar	Apr	May	Jun	Jul	Aug	Sep	Oct	Nov	Dec	Year
Mean daily maximum °C (°F)	−1.6 (29.1)	0.9 (33.6)	3.4 (38.1)	10.0 (50.0)	14.9 (58.8)	18.1 (64.6)	20.3 (68.5)	20.6 (69.1)	18.1 (64.6)	13.2 (55.8)	6.8 (44.2)	0.0 (32.0)	10.4 (50.7)
Daily mean °C (°F)	−5.9 (21.4)	−3.5 (25.7)	−0.8 (30.6)	5.2 (41.4)	10.3 (50.5)	14.0 (57.2)	17.4 (63.3)	17.4 (63.3)	14.2 (57.6)	8.2 (46.8)	2.2 (36.0)	−3.5 (25.7)	6.4 (43.5)
Mean daily minimum °C (°F)	−9.1 (15.6)	−7.5 (18.5)	−5.1 (22.8)	0.7 (33.3)	5.7 (42.3)	10.4 (50.7)	14.7 (58.5)	14.5 (58.1)	11.0 (51.8)	4.3 (39.7)	−0.9 (30.4)	−6.6 (20.1)	2.7 (36.9)
Average precipitation mm (inches)	46.9 (1.85)	128.0 (5.04)	301.2 (11.86)	426.1 (16.78)	653.1 (25.71)	651.9 (25.67)	742.3 (29.22)	836.4 (32.93)	526.7 (20.74)	126.5 (4.98)	165.8 (6.53)	64.6 (2.54)	4,669.4 (183.83)
Source: Jeju Regional Meteorological Administration

In January 2016, a cold wave affected Jeju Island. Snow and frigid weather forced the cancellation of 1,200 flights on Jeju Island, stranding approximately 90,300 passengers.

== See also ==
- Jeju Black, indigenous cattle breed
- Jeju Black pig, indigenous pig breed
- Jeju horse, indigenous horse breed
- Jeju Volcanic Island and Lava Tubes
