= Geomunoreum =

Extinct volcano on Jeju Island, South Korea

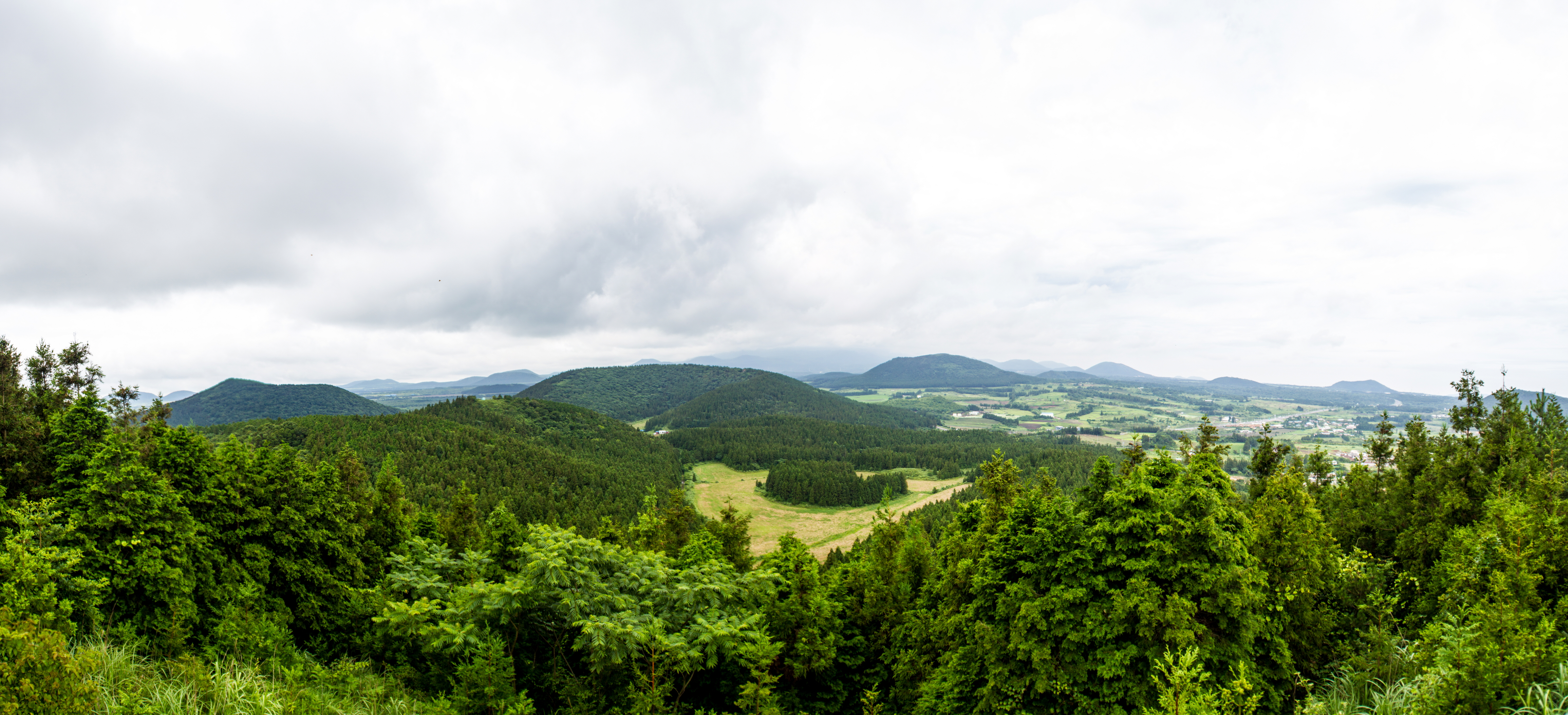
- Looking into the depression in the center of the oreum (2017)

Highest point
- Elevation: 456.6 m (1,498 ft)
- Coordinates: 33°27′17″N 126°43′9″E

Dimensions
- Area: 0.80986 km^{2} (0.31269 mi^{2})

Naming
- Etymology: Dark oreum

Geography
- Location: Jeju City, Jeju Province, South Korea

Korean name
- Hangul: 거문오름
- Hanja: 拒文岳; 巨文岳; 巨門岳
- RR: Geomunoreum
- MR: Kŏmunorŭm

Alternate name
- Hangul: 검은오름
- RR: Geomeunoreum
- MR: Kŏmŭnorŭm

Geomunoreum (Korean: 거문오름; Hanja: 拒文岳; 巨文岳; 巨門岳), alternatively Geomeunoreum (검은오름), is an oreum (small extinct volcano) around Jocheon and Gujwa in Jeju City, South Korea.

The oreum is a popular tourist attraction, and has been a Natural Monument of South Korea No. 444 since January 6, 2005. In 2007, the Geomunoreum Lava Tube System around the oreum was made a UNESCO World Natural Heritage Site, as part of the item Jeju Volcanic Island and Lava Tubes.

There are several other oreum in Jeju with similar names; this one is sometimes called the Seonheul-ri Geomunoreum or Dong Geomunoreum (동거문오름; lit. 'East Geomunoreum').

== Toponymy ==
An early name for the oreum was Bangha Oreum or Banghaak (방하오름; 방하악; 防下岳). The oreum's name was later attested to as Geomunoreum or Geomunak (거문악; 拒文岳). The oreum's name is possibly related to darkness (검은; geomeun in the Gyeonggi dialect), referring to the unusually dark soil or the dark forested areas of the oreum.

== Description ==
It is estimated to have formed between 200,000 and 300,000 years ago. It has 20 lava tube caves around it.

Its highest point is 456.6 m (1,498 ft) above sea level, and occupies an area of 809,860 m^{2} (8,717,300 ft^{2}). The oreum is shaped like a horseshoe that opens to the northeast. It has a trench with a width of 80 to 150 m (260 to 490 ft) and depth of 15 to 30 m (49 to 98 ft). The trench was created from when an underground lava tube collapsed. There is a dense pine and cedar forest on the oreum.

The oreum hosted Japanese military facilities during the 1910–1945 Japanese colonial period. Some remnants of this period remain, including mines.

== Tourism ==
Tourists are able to hike on the oreum. There are two main routes for tourists: Taegeuk (태극길) and Yongam (용암길). The former circles the crater and the oreum's peaks. The latter is only open once a year to tourists, and follows where lava would have flowed. In 2008, an annual hiking competition for it was established. It is during this hiking competition that Yongam is opened for access. Guided tours of the oreum have been offered.
