= Geum Oreum =

Extinct volcano in Jeju City, South Korea

Geomeun Oreum
- Geum Oreum, Geumak
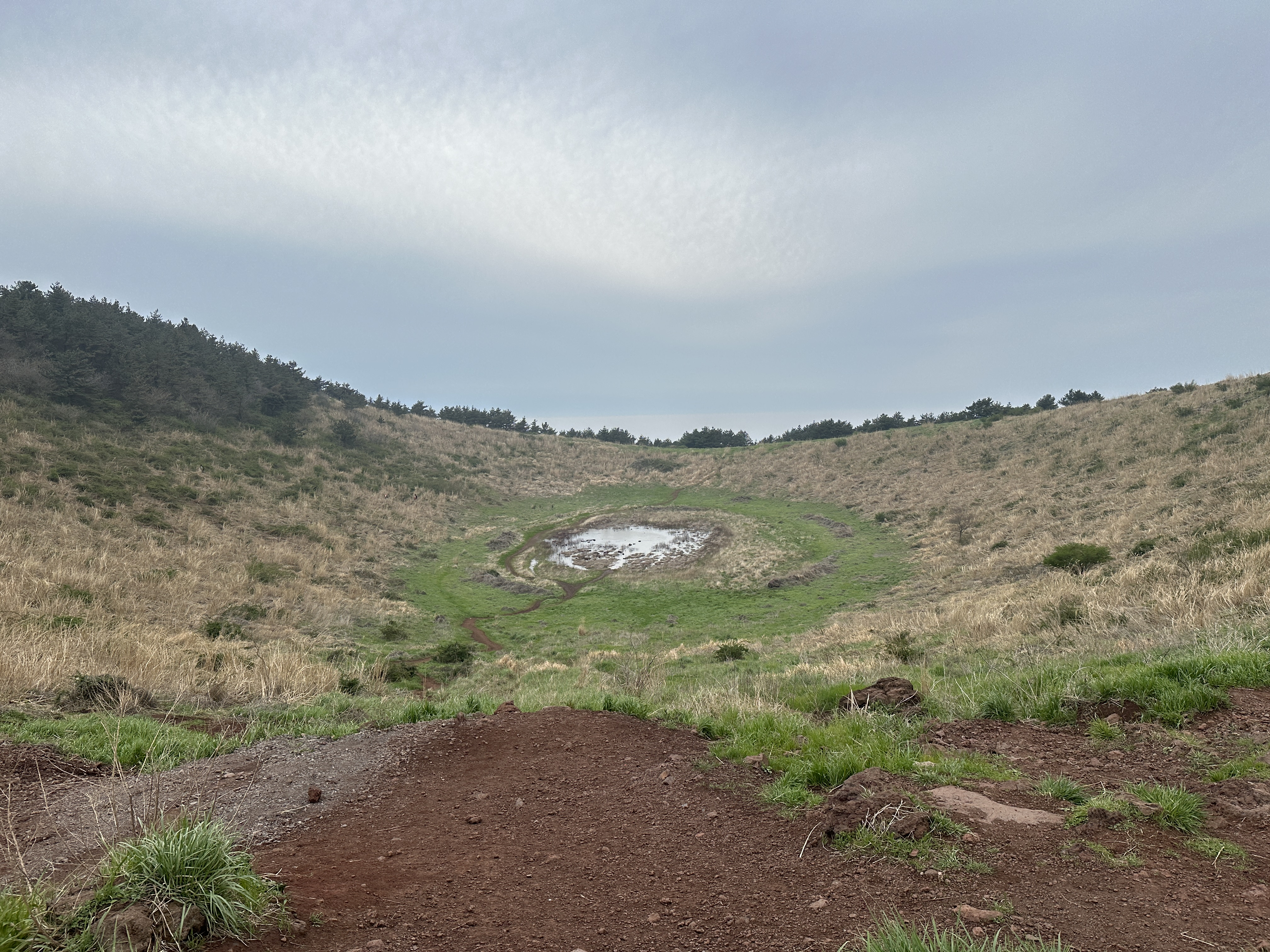
- The marshy area at the top (April 2026)

Highest point
- Elevation: 427 m (1,401 ft)
- Coordinates: 33.3559°N 126.3056°E

Geography
- Location: Hallim, Jeju City, Jeju Province, South Korea

Geomeun Oreum (Korean: 검은 오름; Hanja: 黑岳), popularly called Geum Oreum (금오름; 今岳) and alternately called Geumak (금악; 今岳), is an oreum (small extinct volcano; parasitic cone) in Hallim, Jeju City, South Korea.

== Toponymy ==
The oreum's name possibly refers to the color black, in reference to its dark soil. "Geom" may also mean "god", suggesting that the oreum had an important local spiritual role.

== Description ==
Its highest point is 427 m (1,401 ft) above sea level. It has a height from base of 178 m (584 ft), and covers an area of 613,966 m^{2} (6,608,680 ft^{2}). It has a conical shape. There is a cell tower at the summit, as well as a guard post.

There is a caldera around 52 m (171 ft) deep at the top of the mountain called Wangmae or Ammae (왕메; 암메). It has an area of 30,000 pyeong (99,000 m^{2}). Within the crater is a marshy area that develops a pond after rain. This area is called Geumakdam (금악담; 今岳潭). Amphibians live in this marshy area and have been affected by human activity at the top.

The oreum is on privately owned land. Before 2009, livestock used to graze on the oreum; they were relocated in order to accommodate the safety of tourists. The owners of the oreum dispose of waste on the oreum and maintain its infrastructure.

It is popular for tourists. From the top, tourists can engage in paragliding. It was previously possible to drive up to the summit. However, a 2017 news article reported that driving up to the very top was restricted.

The top reportedly has views of Hallasan and Sanbangsan. In 2017, it was reported that the oreum had an influx of popularity after it was featured in a TV program. For other publicly owned oreum, such as Yongnuni Oreum, the local government enacted halts on tourist activity in order to safeguard the environment. As this oreum is privately owned, the owners declined to do so. There is also a trail that goes up the oreum, and one through its forests. The forest trail opened in 2009.

During the 1910–1945 Japanese colonial period, tunnels were dug into the oreum. Locals hid inside these tunnels during the 1948 Jeju uprising.

== Gallery ==
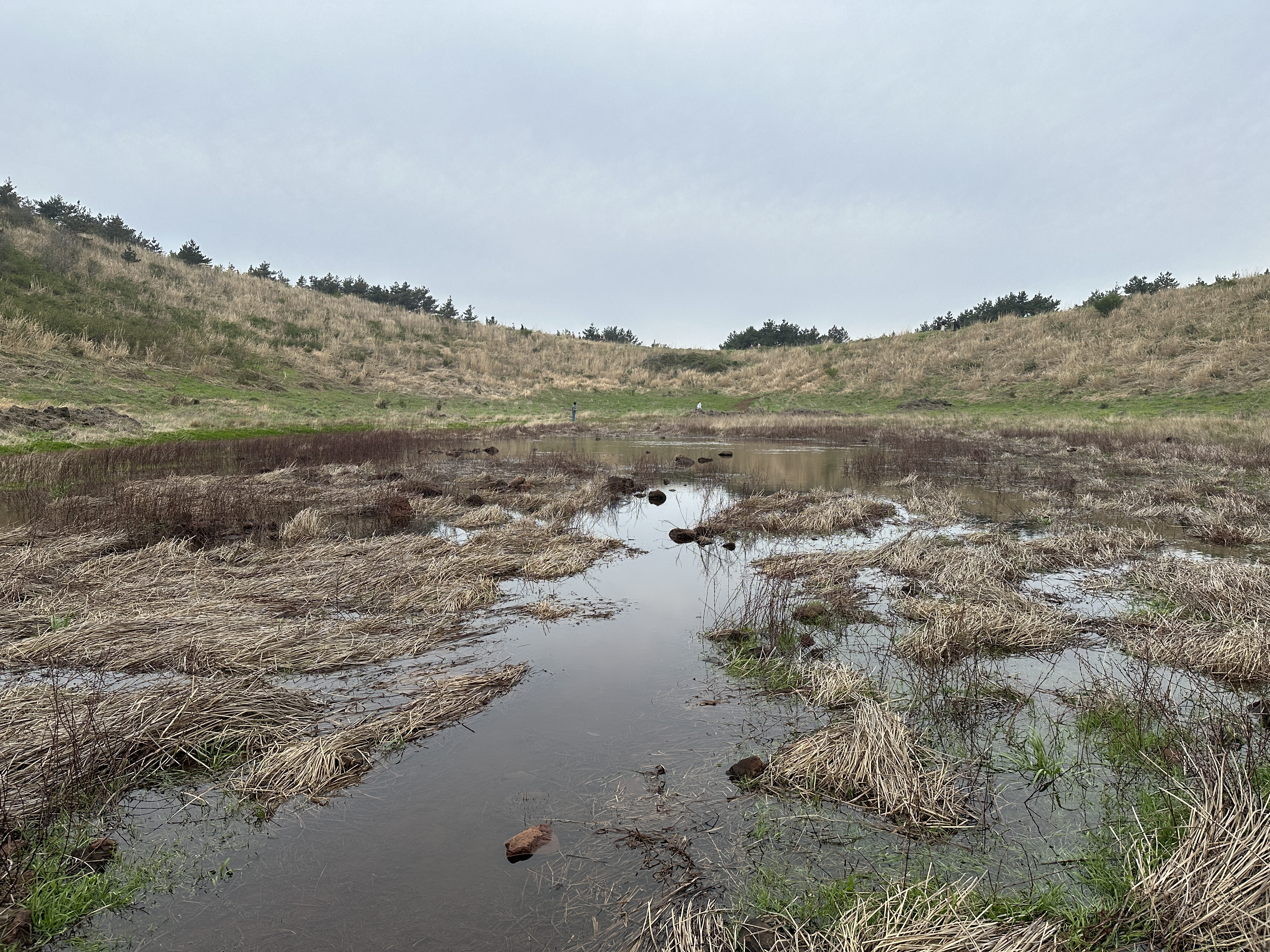
Closeup of the marshy area at the top (2026)

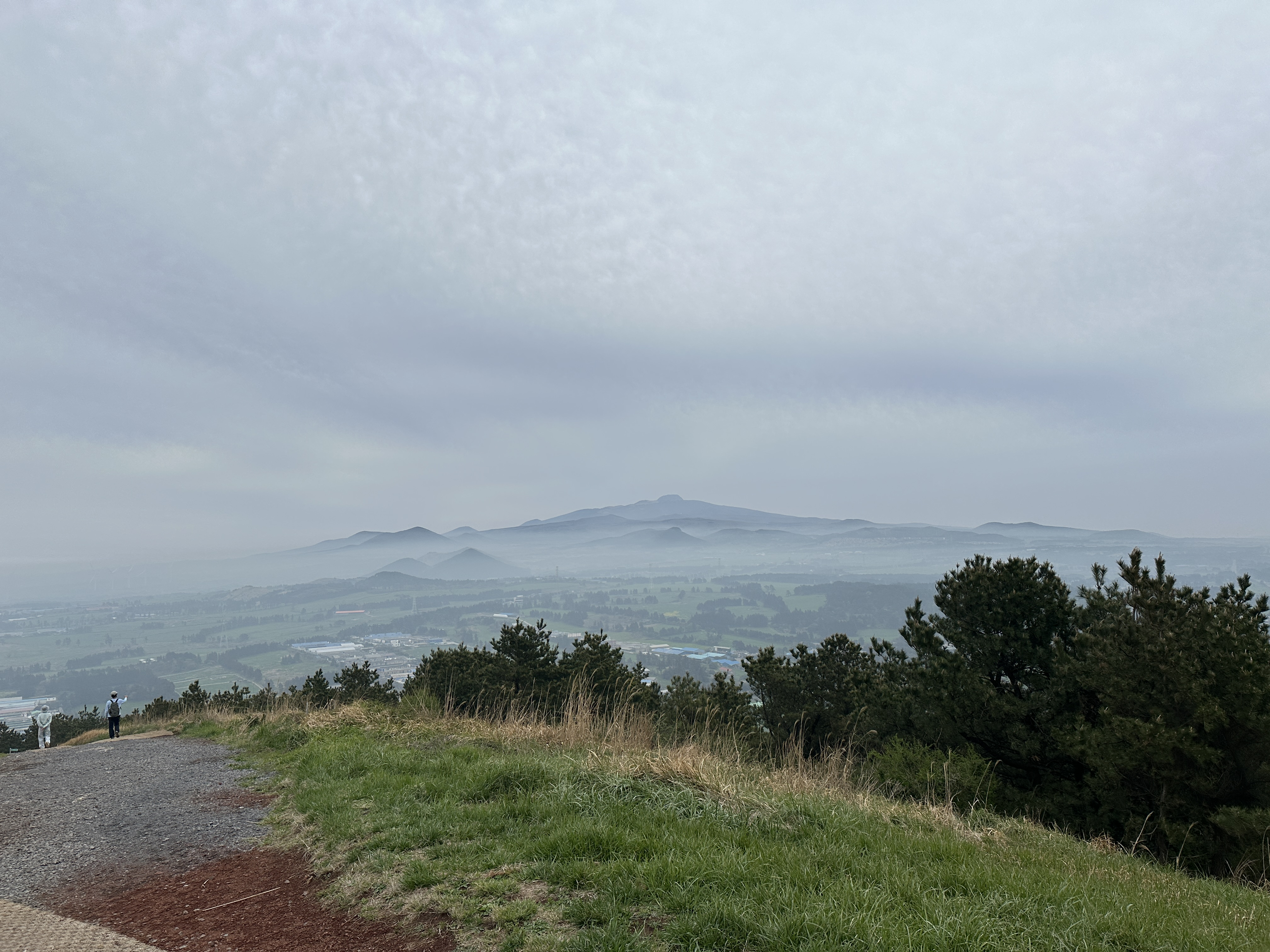
View from the summit of the mountain Hallasan, obscured in the fog (2026)

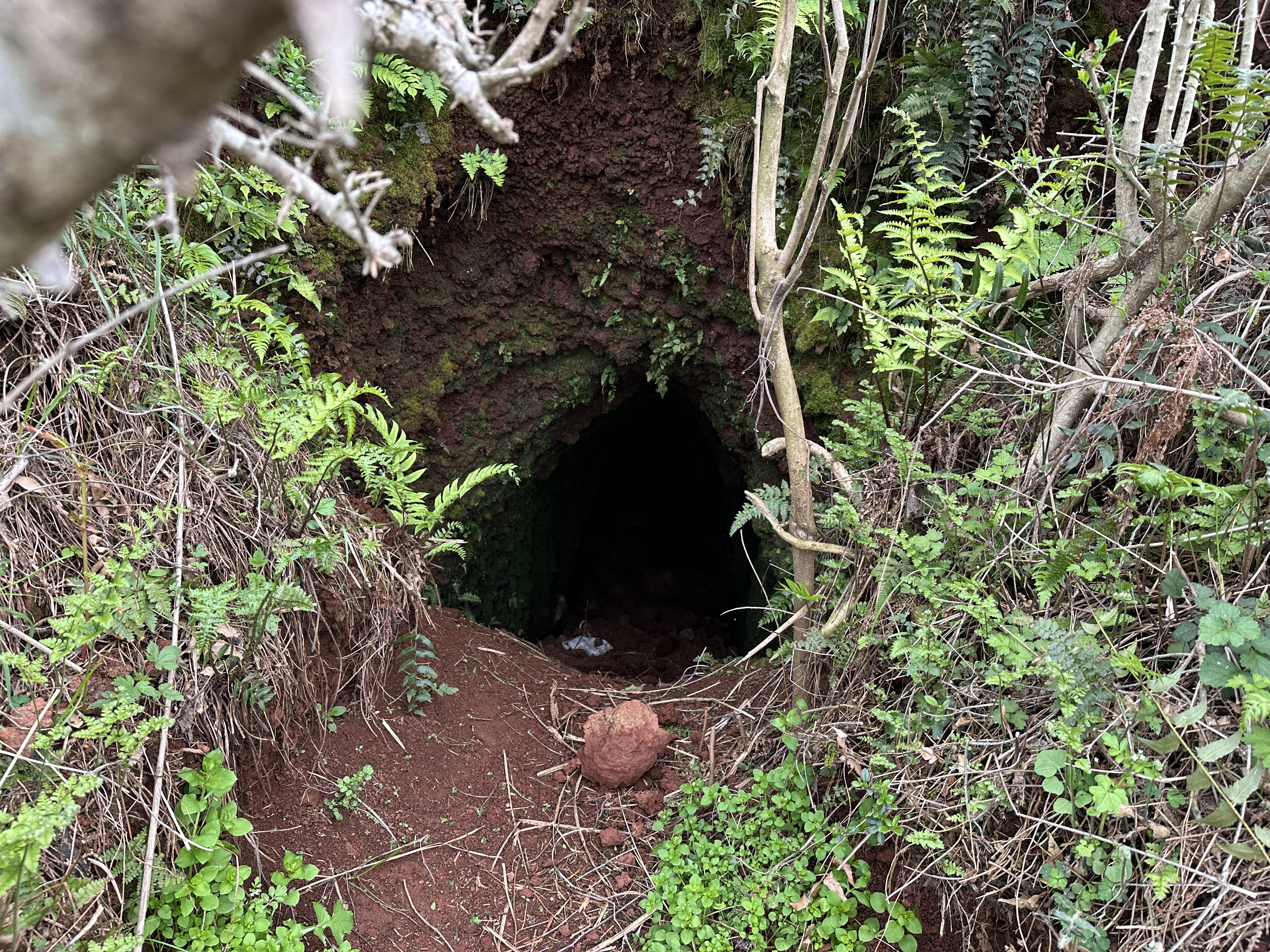
One of the Japanese colonial era tunnels

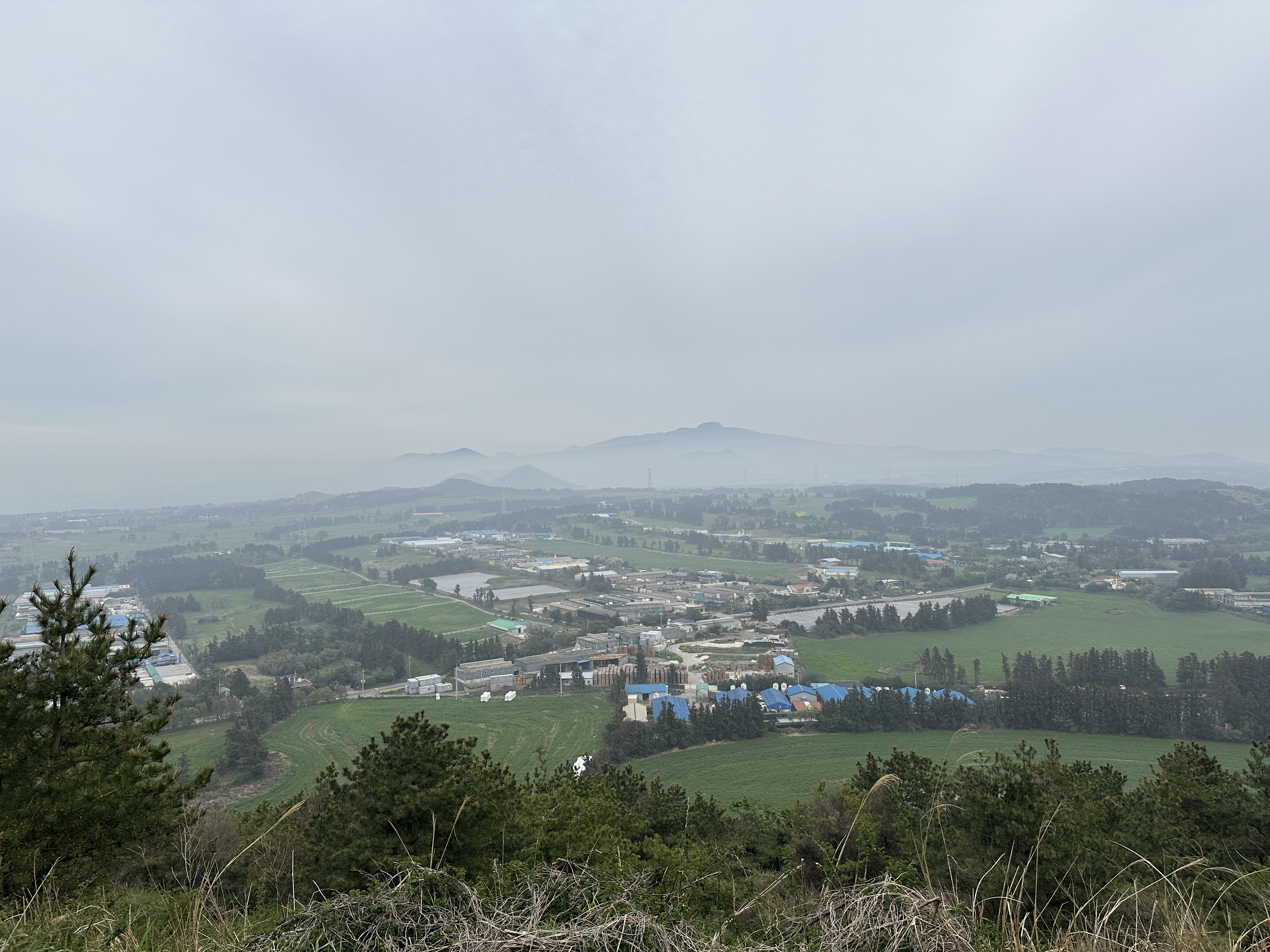
View from the summit
