= Gujwa =

- eup
- View of Gujwa

- Location within South Korea
- Coordinates: 33°30′9.00″N 126°47′39.98″E
- Country: South Korea

Area
  - Total: 185.93 km^{2} (71.79 sq mi)

Population (2019)
  - Total: 16,116
  - Density: 86.678/km^{2} (224.49/sq mi)
- Dialect: Jeju

Korean name
- Hangul: 구좌읍
- Hanja: 舊左邑
- RR: Gujwa-eup
- MR: Kujwa-ŭp

Gujwa (Korean: 구좌읍) is a town located in Jeju City, Jeju Province, South Korea.

The town has Yongnuni Oreum in it.
