= Yongnuni Oreum =

Extinct volcano on Jeju Island, South Korea

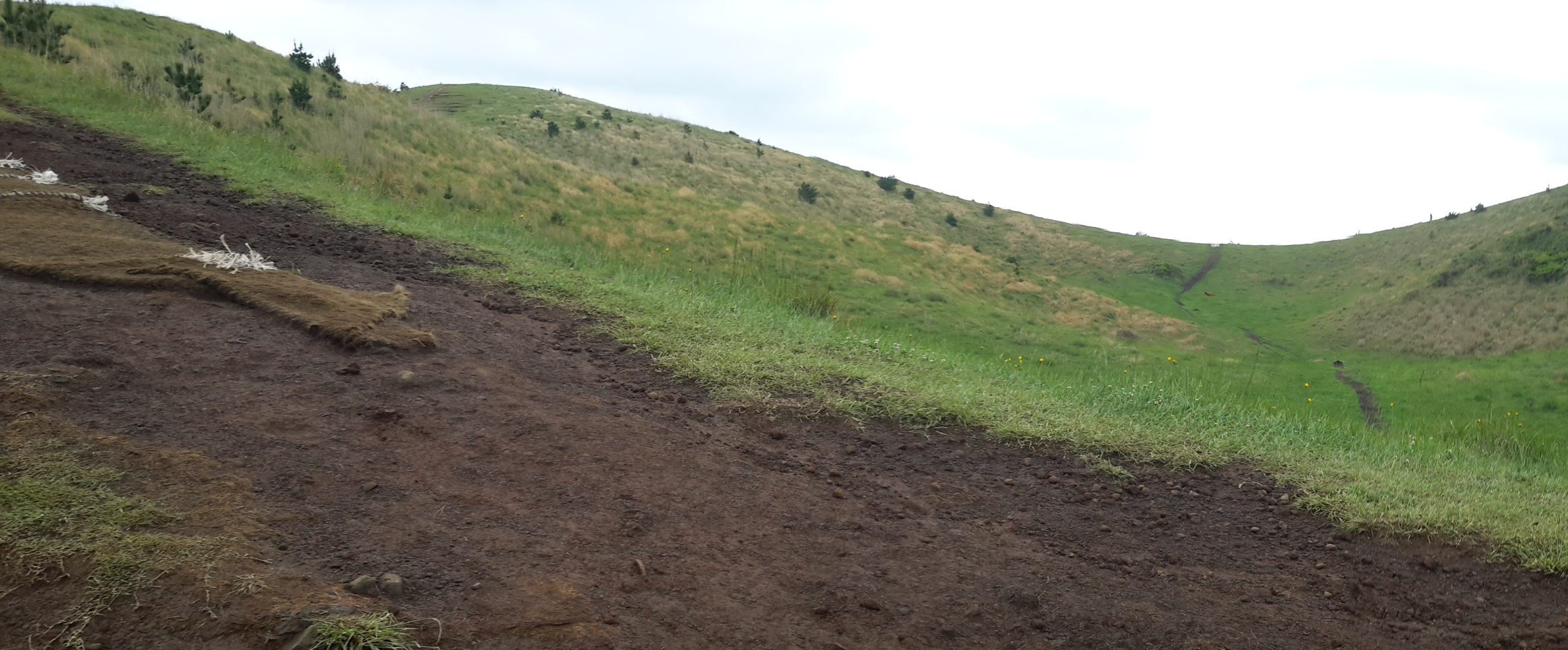

Highest point
- Coordinates: 33.4762°N 126.8229°E

Geography

Korean name
- Hangul: 용눈이오름
- Hanja: 龍눈이오름
- RR: Yongnuni oreum
- MR: Yongnuni orŭm

Yongnuni Oreum (Korean: 용눈이오름) is an oreum (small extinct volcano) in Gujwa, Jeju City, South Korea.

== Toponymy ==
It is generally agreed that the oreum's name means "dragon lying down"; the oreum is said to resemble such. An alternate theory for the name is that it means "dragon's eye"; viewed from the sky it is said to resemble such.

The pronunciation of the oreum's name has evolved over time, and the Hanja used to write it has also changed in response. An archaic name for the oreum is possibly Yongnoni Oreum (용논이오름), rendered as Yongyuak (용유악; 龍遊岳) in Hanja. As it became pronounced as "Yongnuni Oreum", the Hanja changed to Yonganak (용안악; 龍眼岳). The name Yongwaak (용와악; 龍臥岳) was also used as a translation of "Yongnuni"; it also means "dragon lying down".

== Description ==
The oreum is horseshoe-shaped, and opens to the east. It has three peaks, mostly centered on its northeastern side. It is a cinder cone, and has a summit elevation of 247.8 m (813 ft), although it is around 88 m (289 ft) above the surrounding area. It occupies an area of 404,264 m^{2} (4,351,460 ft^{2}). The oreum is considered beautiful, and has fragrant fields of grass and flowers. The oreum is located in an area densely populated with other oreums.

It is considered to have a gradual incline and to not be very tall, and thus is popular for family hikes on its trails. It is considered one of the most popular oreums for visitors on the eastern side of Jeju. At the top is a scenic view of the area, which includes views of the mountain Seongsan Ilchulbong and island Udo. There is a parking lot, restrooms, and a store at its trailhead. Visitors are required to not dispose of trash on the mountain and to only walk on the trail.

It had a significant increase in popularity in 2017, after it appeared on a popular variety show. After experiencing heavy visitor traffic, from February 1, 2021, to January 31, 2023, pedestrian access to the oreum was restricted, for the sake of environmental protection. A fine was put in place for anyone who entered the oreum during this time. The trail's course was changed, and a soft coconut fiber mat was laid down on the trail. One reporter claimed that this new trail took around an hour to complete, round trip. The Jeju government announced in 2024 that it was pursuing further policies to protect the environment on the oreum.
