= Jeju Province =

Province of South Korea

Jeju Special Self-Governing Province 제주특벨ᄌᆞ치도 (Jejueo) 제주특별자치도 (Korean)
- Special Self-Governing Province
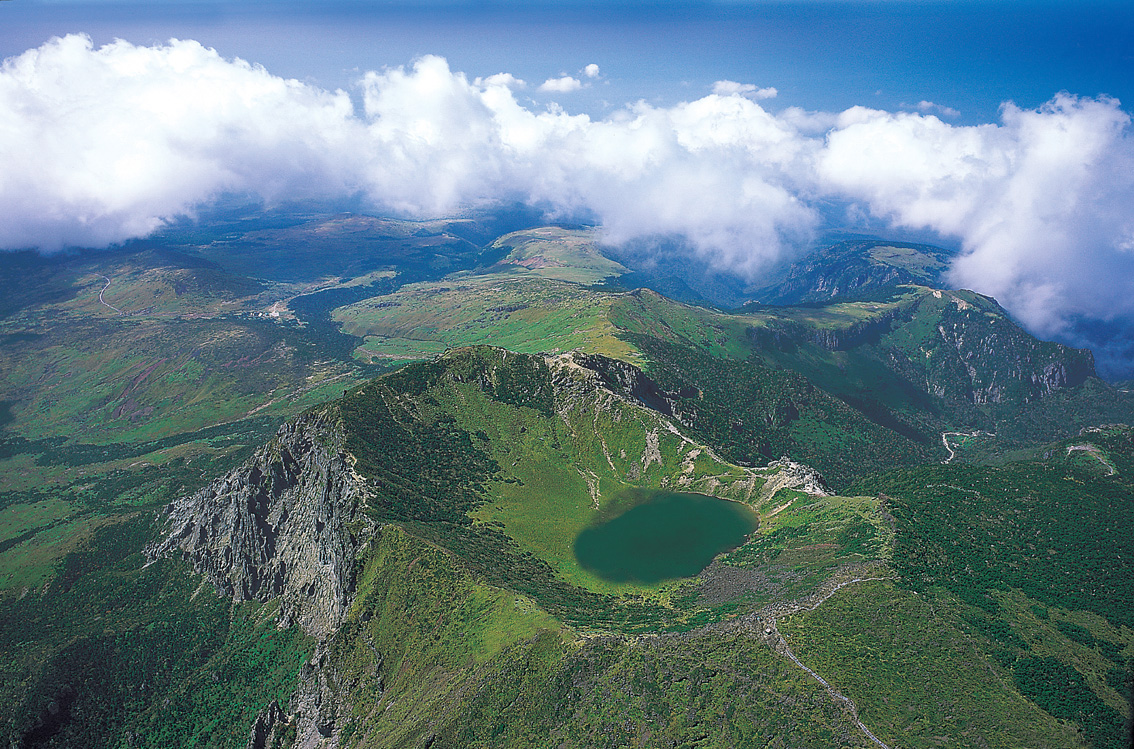
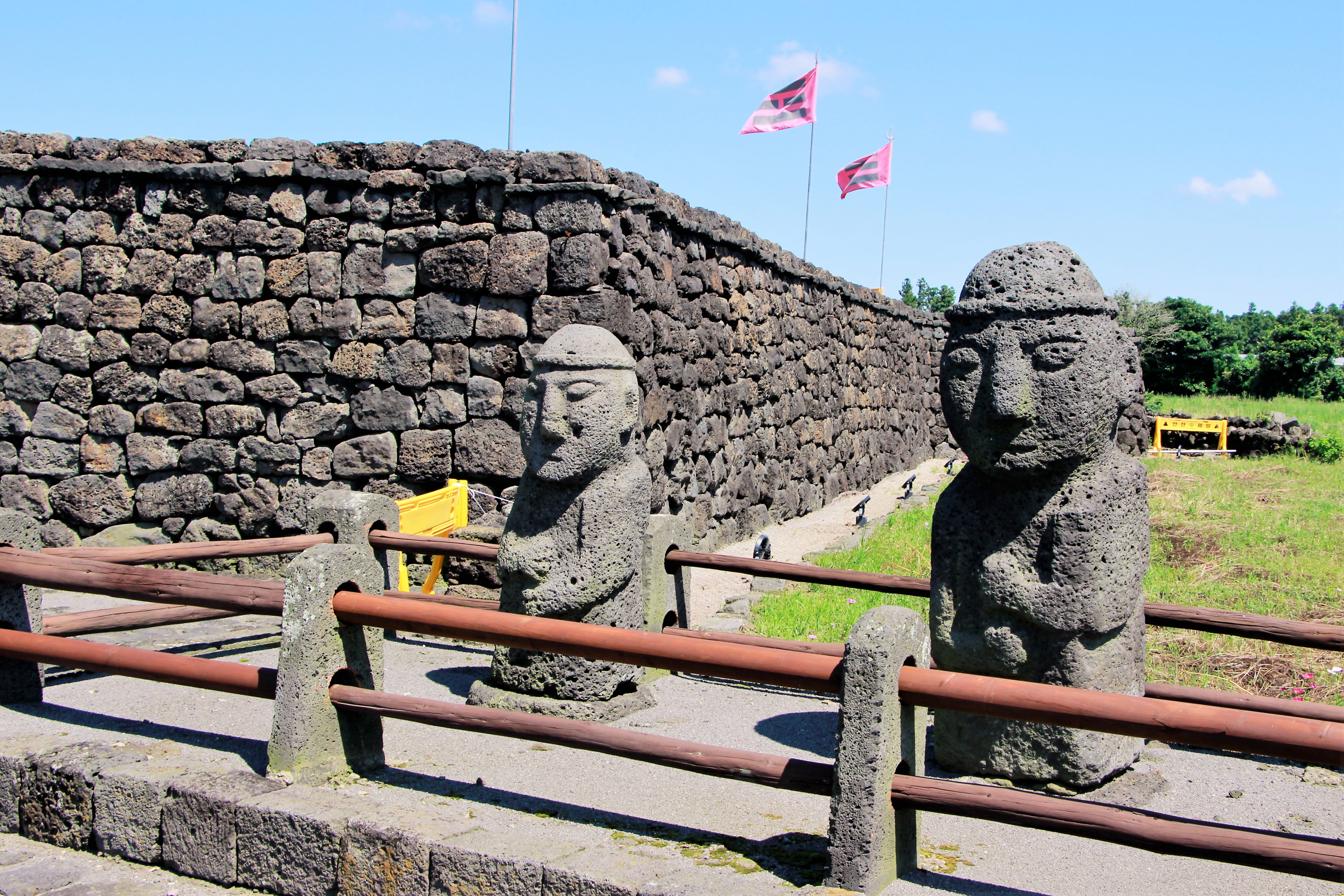
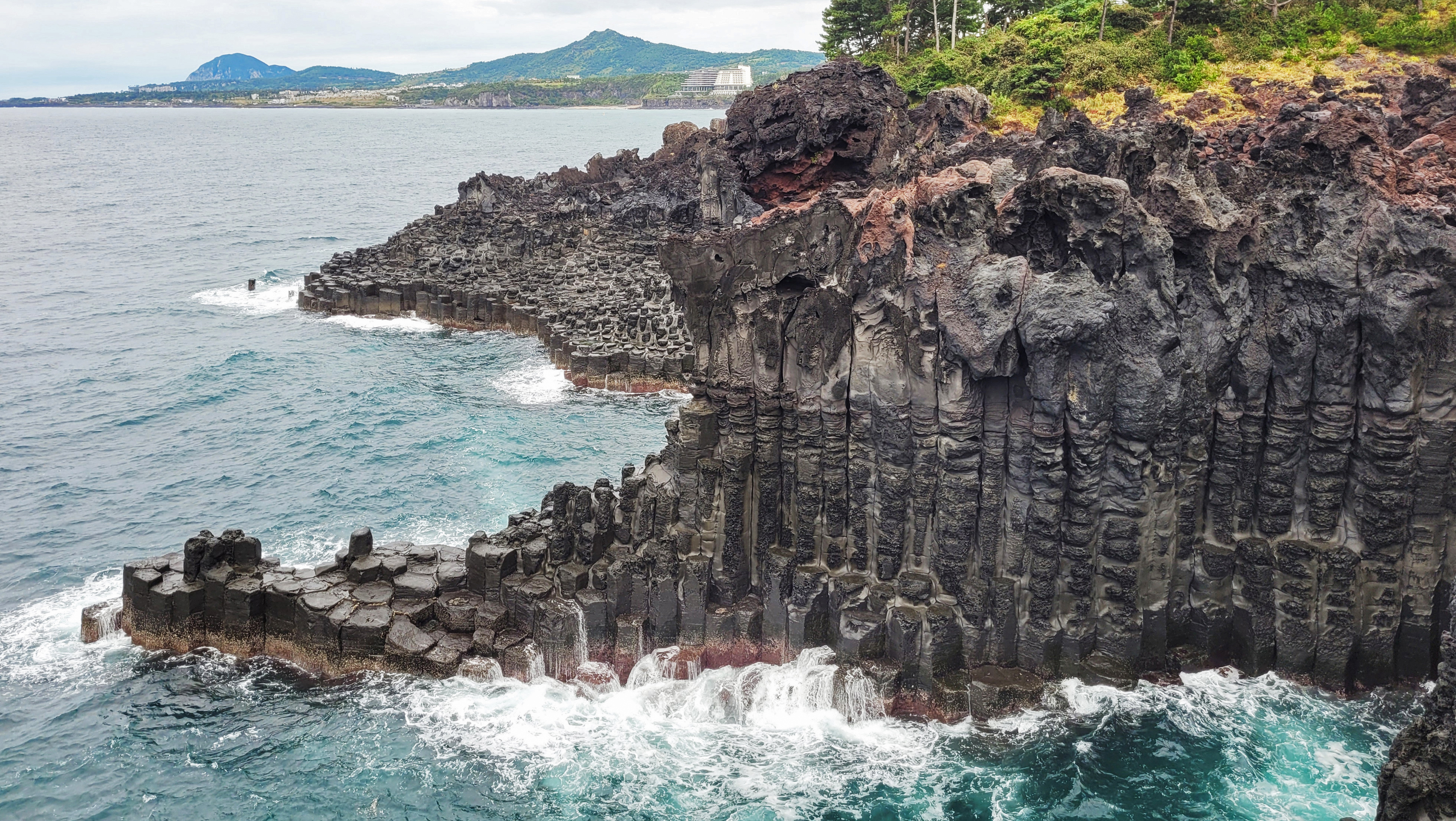
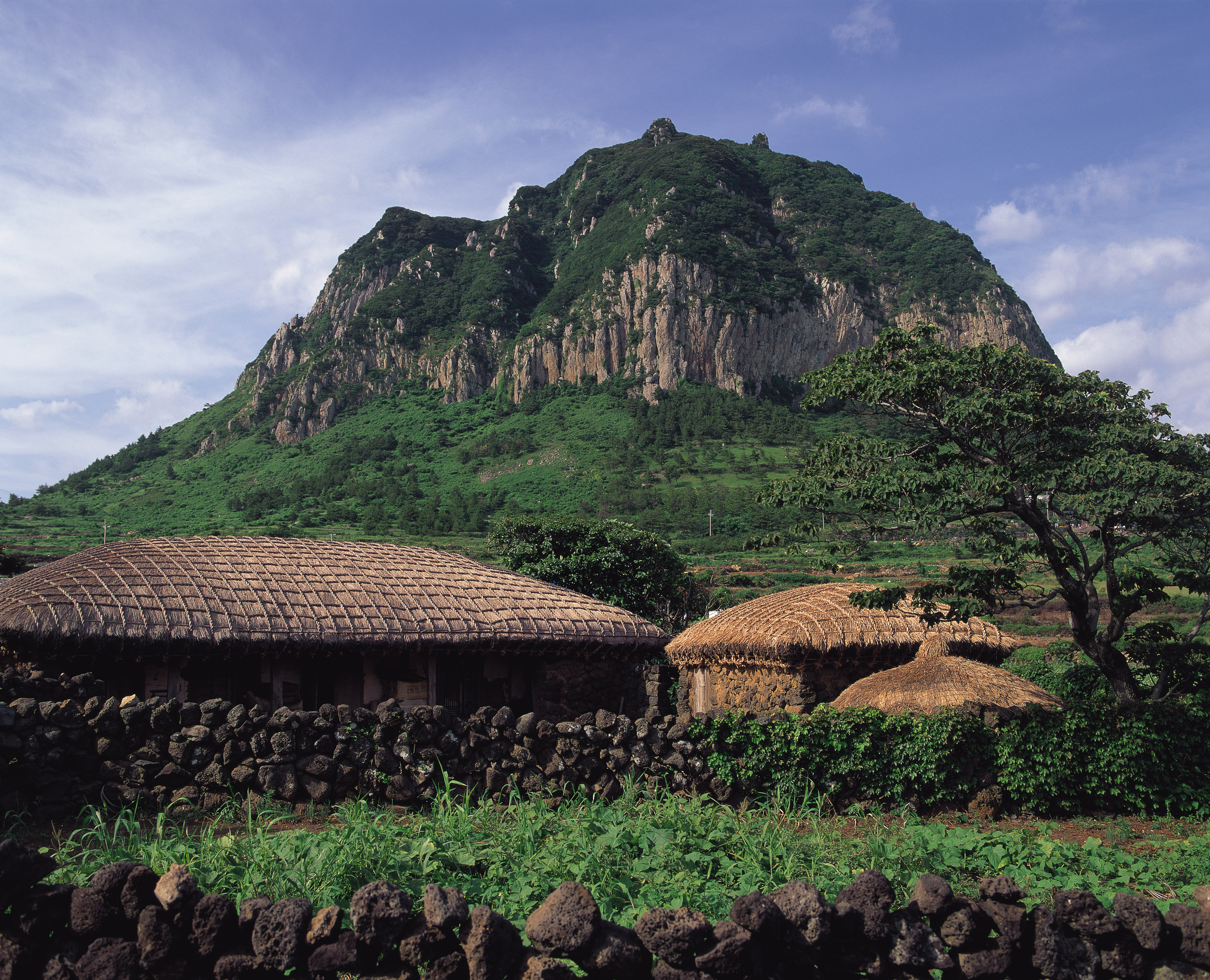
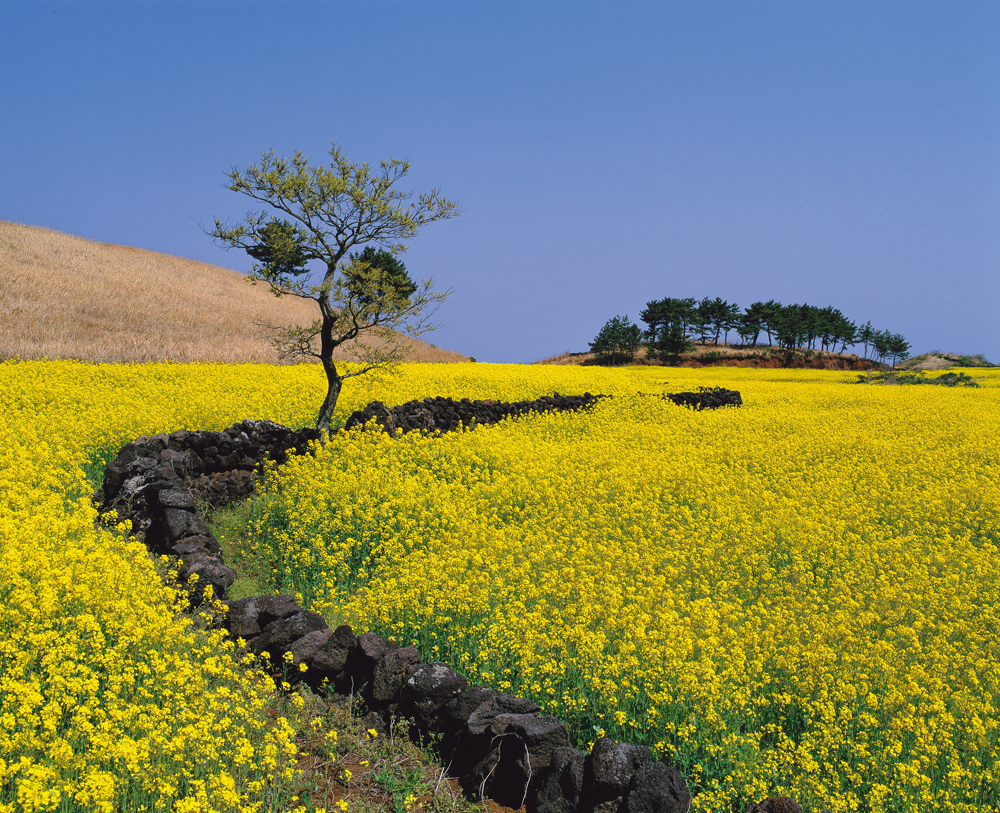
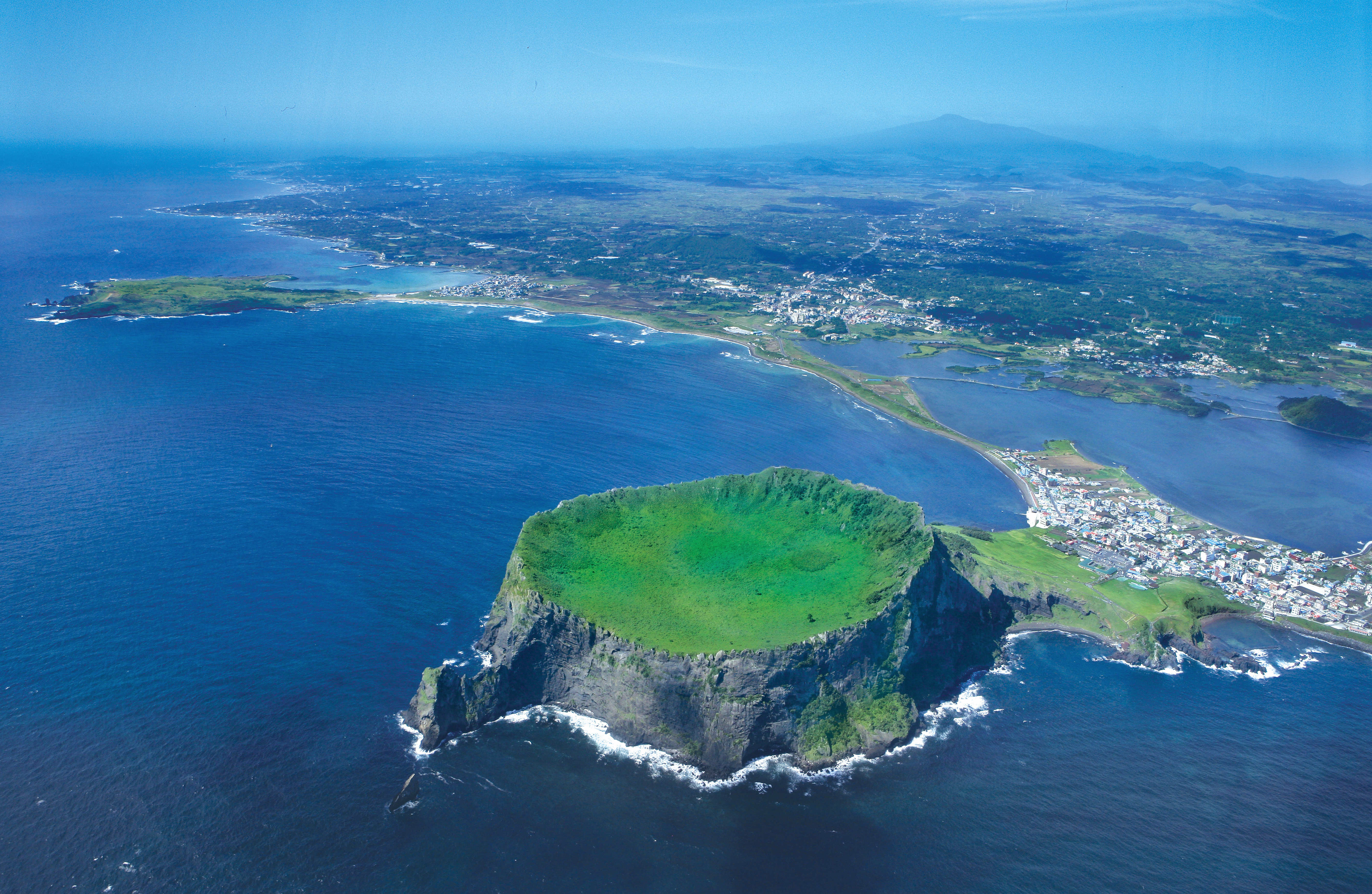
- Hallasan Dol hareubang at Seongeup Folk Village Daepo Jusangjeolli Cliff Sanbangsan Doldam walls and rapeseed flowers Seongsan Ilchulbong

- Flag Logo

- Coordinates: 33°29′20″N 126°29′54″E
- Country: South Korea
- Region: Jeju
- Separated from South Jeolla Province: 1 August 1946
- Special Self-Governing Province: 1 July 2006
- Capital: Jeju City
- Subdivisions: 2 cities; 5 counties

Government
  - Governor: Wi Seong-gon (Democratic)
  - Body: Jeju Provincial Council
  - National Representation: National Assembly: 3 / 253 1.19% (constituency seats)

Area
  - Total: 1,849 km^{2} (714 sq mi)
  - Rank: 9th

Population (November 2020)
  - Total: 670,858
  - Rank: 9th
  - Density: 362.8/km^{2} (939.7/sq mi)

Metropolitan Symbols
  - Flower: Rhododendron (Rhododendron weyrichii, Chamkkot)
  - Tree: Camphor laurel (Cinnamomum camphora, Noknamu)
  - Bird: White-backed woodpecker (Dendrocopos leucotos quelpartensis )

GDP (Nominal, 2023)
  - Total: KRW 26 trillion (US$ 21 billion)
  - Per capita: US$ 31,150
- Postal code: 63XXX
- Area code: +82-64-7xx
- Languages: Jeju, Korean
- HDI (2017): 0.888 very high
- Website: Official website (English)

Korean name
- Hangul: 제주특별자치도
- Hanja: 濟州特別自治道
- RR: Jeju-teukbyeoljachido
- MR: Cheju-t'ŭkpyŏljach'ido

Jeju Province (Jeju and Korean: 제주도), officially Jeju Special Self-Governing Province (Jeju: 제주특벨ᄌᆞ치도; Korean: 제주특별자치도), is the southernmost province of South Korea, consisting of eight inhabited and 55 uninhabited islands, including Marado, Udo, the Chuja Archipelago, and the country's largest island, Jeju Island. (Note: formerly transliterated as Cheju Island or Cheju Do, the island was also previously known as Quelpart to Europeans and as Saishū during the Japanese occupation of Korea.) The province is located in the Korea Strait, with the Korean Peninsula to the northwest, Japan to the east, and China to the west.

The province has two cities: the capital Jeju City, on the northern half of the island, and Seogwipo, on the southern half of the island. The island is home to the shield volcano Hallasan, the highest point in South Korea. Korean is the official language of the province, while Jeju is protected under an ordinance by the Korean government, as UNESCO classifies it as a critically endangered language.

Jeju Island was first settled by humans 8,000 to 10,000 years ago and the Tamna Kingdom is the earliest known civilization on the island. Beginning in the 5th century AD, the kingdom would become a tributary state of various Korean Kingdoms until being annexed into Goryeo in 1105. The island was invaded by the Mongol Empire in 1271 and later became part of Joseon in 1392. Joseon ruled the island brutally and multiple uprisings occurred. Jeju Island, with the rest of mainland Korea, was annexed by the Empire of Japan in 1910. Following Japan's surrender in World War II in 1945, the islands became part of South Jeolla Province in the United States Army Military Government in Korea, before becoming a separate province on 1 August 1946. On 1 July 2006, the islands were designated a Special Self-Governing Province; it is now one of three special self-governing provinces, the others being Gangwon State and Jeonbuk State.

== History ==
=== Early history ===
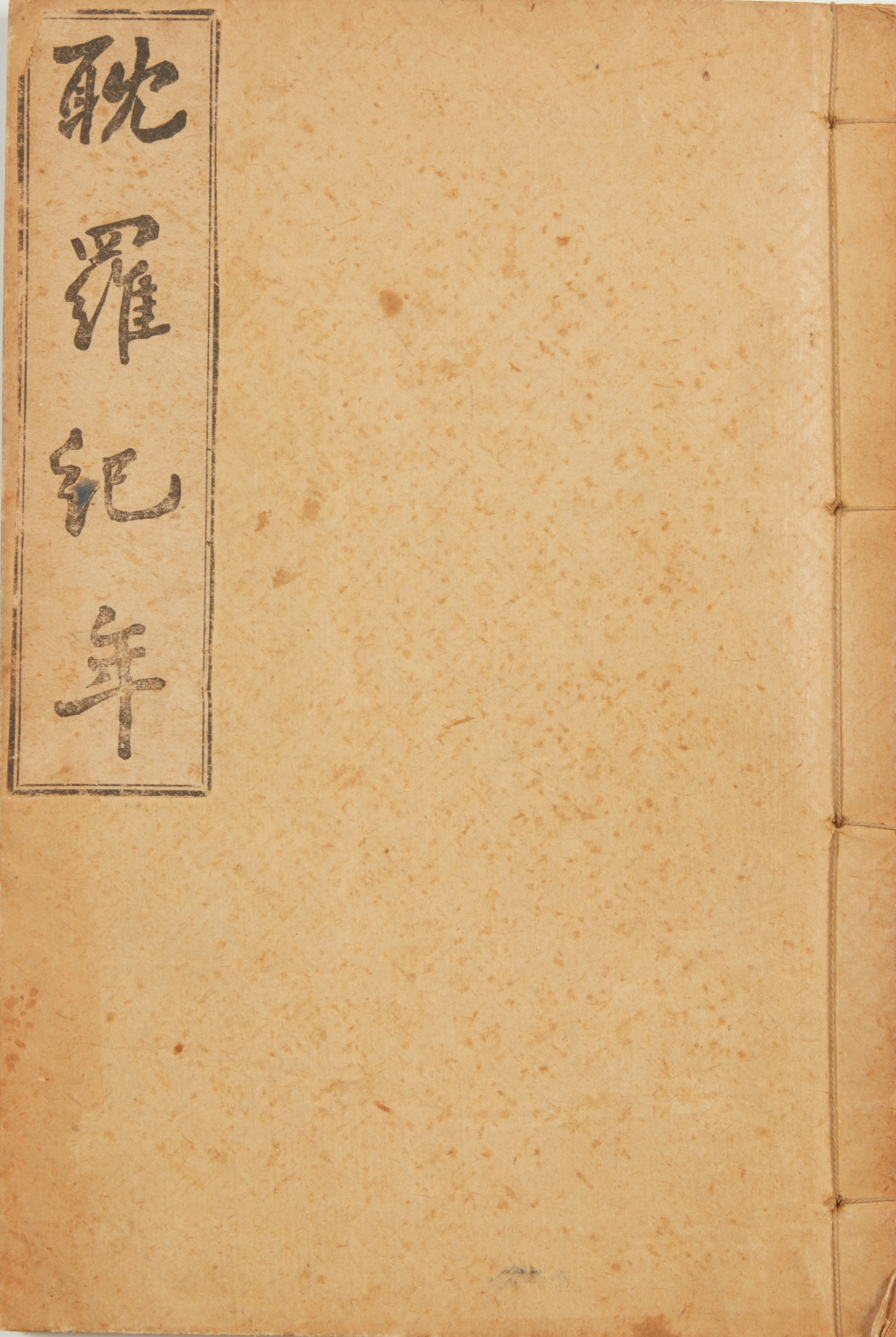
Tamna Ginyun, a history book written over 934 years from the Goryeo period to the Joseon period

The earliest known polity on the island was the kingdom of Tamna.

According to the legend, three demigods emerged from Samseong, which is said to have been on the northern slopes of Hallasan and became the progenitors of the Jeju people, who founded the Kingdom of Tamna.

It has also been claimed that three brothers, including Ko-hu, who were the 15th descendants of Koulla, one of the progenitors of the Jeju people, were received by the court of Silla, at which time the name Tamna was officially recognized, while the official government posts of Commander, Prince and Governor were conferred by the court upon the three. However, there is no concrete evidence of when the "Three Names" (Samseong-Ko, Yang and Pu) appeared nor the exact date of when Ko-hu and his brothers were received by Silla. The "Three Names" Founding Period may be assumed to have occurred during the Three Kingdoms (Goguryeo, Baekje and Silla) Period on the mainland of Korea.

Taejo, founder of Goryeo, attempted to establish the same relationship between Goryeo and Tamna as Tamna had had with Silla. Tamna refused to accept this position and the Goryeo court dispatched troops to force Tamna to submit. Ko ja-gyeon, chief of Tamna, submitted to Goryeo in 938 and sent his son, Prince Mallo, to Goryeo's court as a de facto hostage. In 1105, (King Sukjong's 10th year), the Goryeo court abolished the name Takna, which had been used up to this time and, from that year on, the island was known as "Tamna-gun" (district) and Goryeo officials were sent to handle the affairs of the island.

Tamna-country was changed to Tamna-county in 1153, during the reign of King Uijong and Choi Cheok-kyeong was posted as Tamna-Myeong or Chief of Tamna. During the reign of Gojong of Goryeo, Tamna was renamed "Jeju", which means "province across the sea".

In 1271, General Kim T'ong-jŏng escaped with what remained of his Sambyeolcho force from Jindo and built the Hangpadu Fortress at Kwiil-chon from where they continued their fight against the combined Korean government-Mongolian army, but within two years, faced by an enemy army of over 10,000 troops, the Sambyeolcho was annihilated.

After Mongol invasions of Korea, the Mongol Empire established a base on Jeju Island with its ally, the Goryeo army in (Tamna prefectures) and converted part of the island to a grazing area for the Korean and Mongol cavalry stationed there. After the Sambyeolcho Rebellion was crushed by the Yuan authorities, Tamna prefectures were established and were used to graze horses, until 1356.

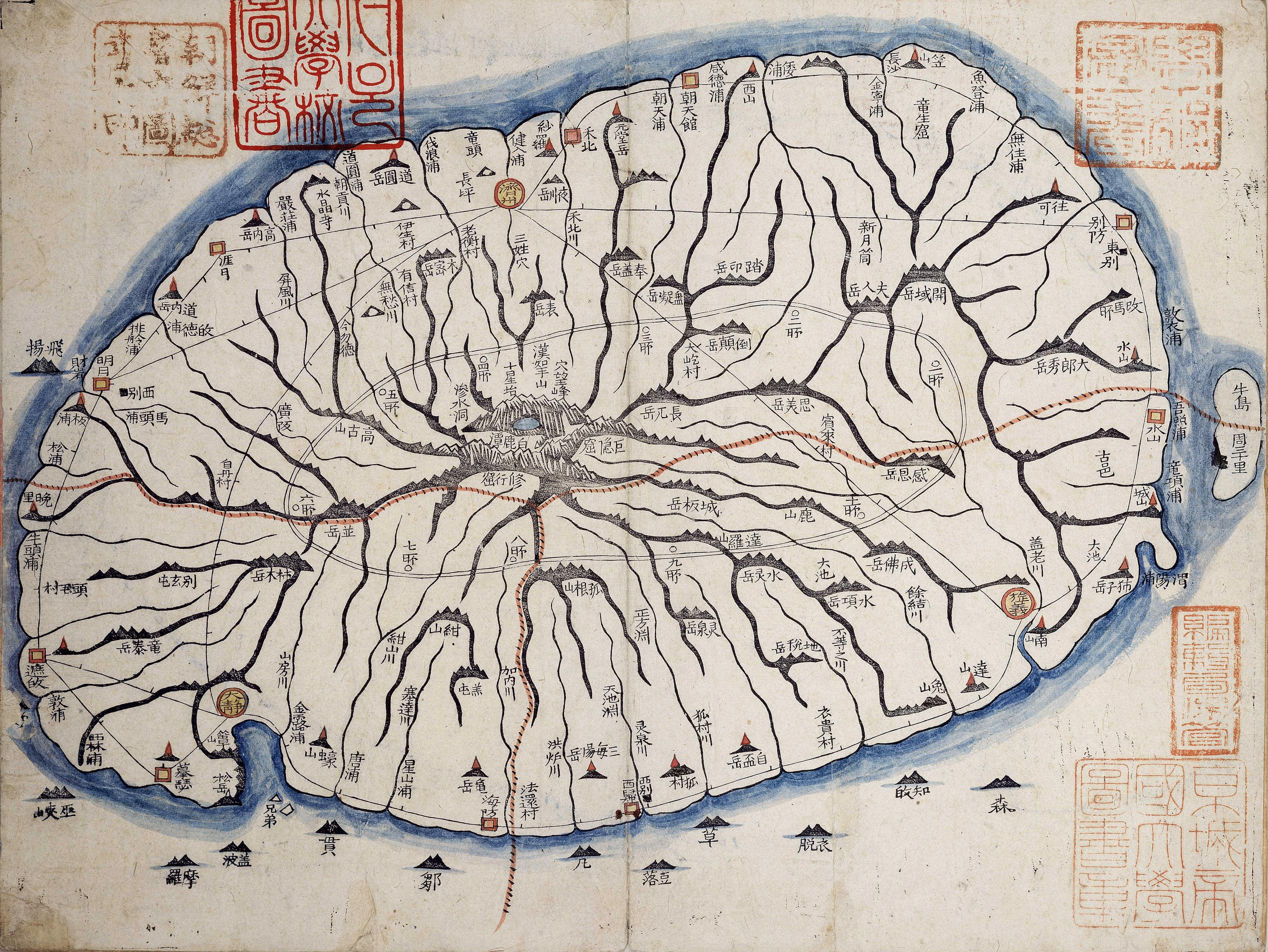
Map of Jeju from the 1861 Daedongyeojido

In the beginning of the 15th century, Jeju Island was subjected to the highly centralized rule of the Joseon dynasty. During much of the Joseon period (1392–1910), Jeju islanders were treated as foreigners and Jeju was considered as a place for horse breeding and exile for political prisoners. In the 17th century, Injo of Joseon issued an edict prohibiting islanders from travelling to the Korean mainland. Consequently, Jeju islanders staged several major uprisings, including the Kang Je Geom Rebellion (1862), Bang Seong Chil Rebellion (1898), and the Lee Jae Su Rebellion (1901).

=== Modern history ===
==== Japanese occupation ====
In 1910, Japan annexed Korea, including Jeju, inaugurating a period of hardship and deprivation for the islanders, many of whom were compelled to travel to the mainland or Japan for work. Residents of Jeju were active in the Korean independence movement during the period of Japanese rule. On Jeju, the peak of resistance came in 1931–32 when haenyeo ("sea women") from six eastern villages launched a protest against the Japanese-controlled Divers Association. Before it was brutally crushed, the protests spread and eventually 17,000 people participated, with over 100 arrested in Korea's largest protest movement ever led by women and fisheries workers.

==== Jeju uprising, 1948 ====
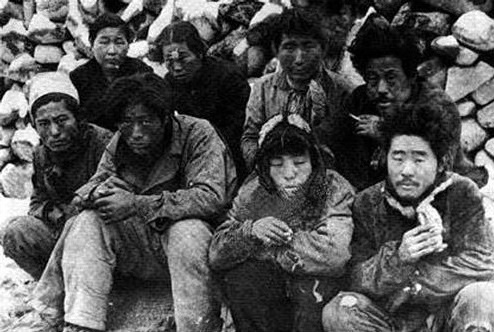
Suspected communist sympathizers awaiting execution in May 1948 after the Jeju uprising

The brutal and often indiscriminate suppression of the rebellion resulted in the deaths of thousands of civilians and insurgents, and the imprisonment of thousands more in internment camps. 14,000 to 30,000 people were killed in total during the 13 month uprising.

From 3 April 1948, to May 1949, the South Korean government conducted an anticommunist campaign to suppress an attempted uprising on the island. The main cause for the rebellion was the election scheduled for 10 May 1948, designed by the United Nations Temporary Commission on Korea (UNTCOK) to create a new government for all of Korea. The elections were only planned for the south of the country, the half of the peninsula under UNTCOK control. Fearing that the elections would further reinforce division, guerrilla fighters of the Workers' Party of South Korea (WPSK) reacted violently, attacking local police and rightist youth groups stationed on Jeju Island.

The Northwest Youth League, a far-right Korean government-sponsored group made up of refugees who had fled North Korea, actively repressed any and all "communist sympathizers" including a policy of shooting anyone entering or leaving the president's declared "enemy zone". This led to the deaths of hundreds of islanders. Many islanders were also raped and tortured. The isolation of Jeju and a cover up by the Korean government led to public ignorance of the Jeju uprising by mainland Koreans for many years. A 1988 documentary by Thames TV, Korea: The Unknown War and many activities and publications, including Sun-i Samch'on by Hyun Ki Young, by organizations and persons from within Jeju-do and around the world continue to attempt to shed the light on this event. The uprising has become a symbol of Jeju's independence from the Korean Peninsula.

The provincial administrative building was burned to the ground in September 1948 and a new building was completed in 1-do, 2-dong in December 1952.

In 2008, bodies of victims of a massacre were discovered in a mass grave near Jeju International Airport.

==== 21st century ====
On 27 June 2007, Jeju Volcanic Island and Lava Tubes was unanimously made a UNESCO World Heritage site at the 31st World Heritage Committee.

On 11 November 2018, it was announced that preparations were being made for North Korean leader Kim Jong Un to visit Jeju during his upcoming visit to South Korea. Kim would be transported to Jeju via helicopter. The announcement came in after 200 tonnes of tangerines harvested in Jeju were flown to North Korea as a sign of appreciation for nearly 2 tonnes of North Korean mushrooms Kim gave to South Korea as a gift, following the September 2018 inter-Korean summit.

In November 2020, South Korean archeologists announced the discovery of a 900-year-old lost slipway off the coast of Sinchangli. Researchers also discovered bright objects, coins and ceramics belonging to the Northern Song dynasty.

==== Jeju Naval Base ====
In 1993, South Korea began planning a naval base on Jeju Island. In June 2007, Gangjeong, a village on the southern coast of the island, was selected as the site of the $970 million naval base. Construction started in Gangjeong village in 2007, with planned completion by 2011. The base was designed to be a mixed military-commercial port similar to those in Sydney and Hawaii, that could accommodate 20 warships and three submarines, as well as two civilian cruise ships displacing up to 150,000 tons. Its official name is the Jeju Civilian-Military Complex Port. Jeju residents, environmentalists, and opposition parties opposed the construction claiming that environmental hazards will damage the "Island of Peace" designated as such by the government. Villagers have protested and filed lawsuits to try to block construction and have widely publicized their opposition. The protests caused delays in the construction. The base was completed in 2016.

== Logo ==
The script in the official Jeju logo is colored black, to evoke the basalt of the island, indicating that Jeju's traditions should be preserved and developed. The green symbolizes the natural environment of Hallasan and Jeju, blue symbolizes the sea of Jeju, and orange symbolizes "the hopeful future and value of Jeju Special Self-Governing Province".

== Administrative divisions ==
=== Historical ===
In 1273, the Mongolian Yuan dynasty established a military governor on the island. For nearly a hundred years the island was effectively under the complete control of these governors.

During the Joseon period, all of the administrative rights and systems of Jeju Island, which had maintained some independence until this time, were absorbed into the centralized form of government established by Joseon.

In 1402, the titles of Commander and Prince were abolished. In 1416, the island was divided into three major administrative districts: the area lying generally north of Hallasan was headed by a 'Moksa' or county magistrate, while the eastern area of Jeongui-county (today's Seongeup Folk Village) and the southwestern area of Daejeong-county (today's Moseulpo, Daejeong-eup, and Sanbangsan) were each headed by a Hyeon-gam (also county magistrate).

In August 1864, both Jeongui and Daejeong hyeons were removed from the control of the 'moksa' north of the mountain in today's Jeju-si area and were renamed 'Gun" (county) and came under the direct control of the Gwanchalsa (governor) of Jeolla province. Because of strife between these 'Guns' and the Jeju 'moksa', the system was abolished in January 1880, and the two 'Guns' reverted again to 'hyeon'.

In 1895, Jeju-mok was redesigned as Jeju-Bu with a governor (Gwanchalsa) and Vice-governor (Chamsagwan) and a police agency was newly established, while in both Jeongui and Daejeong the offices of 'Gunsu' (county chief) were re-established. The very next year, the office of 'Gunsu' was abolished and the old system was restored.

Then in 1906, abolishing the Moksa system altogether, the Gunsu or County chief system was adopted. In 1910, Jeongui and Daejeong were included in Jeju gun while Chuja-myeon was placed under the jurisdiction of Wando-gun, part of South Jeolla province.

=== Modern ===
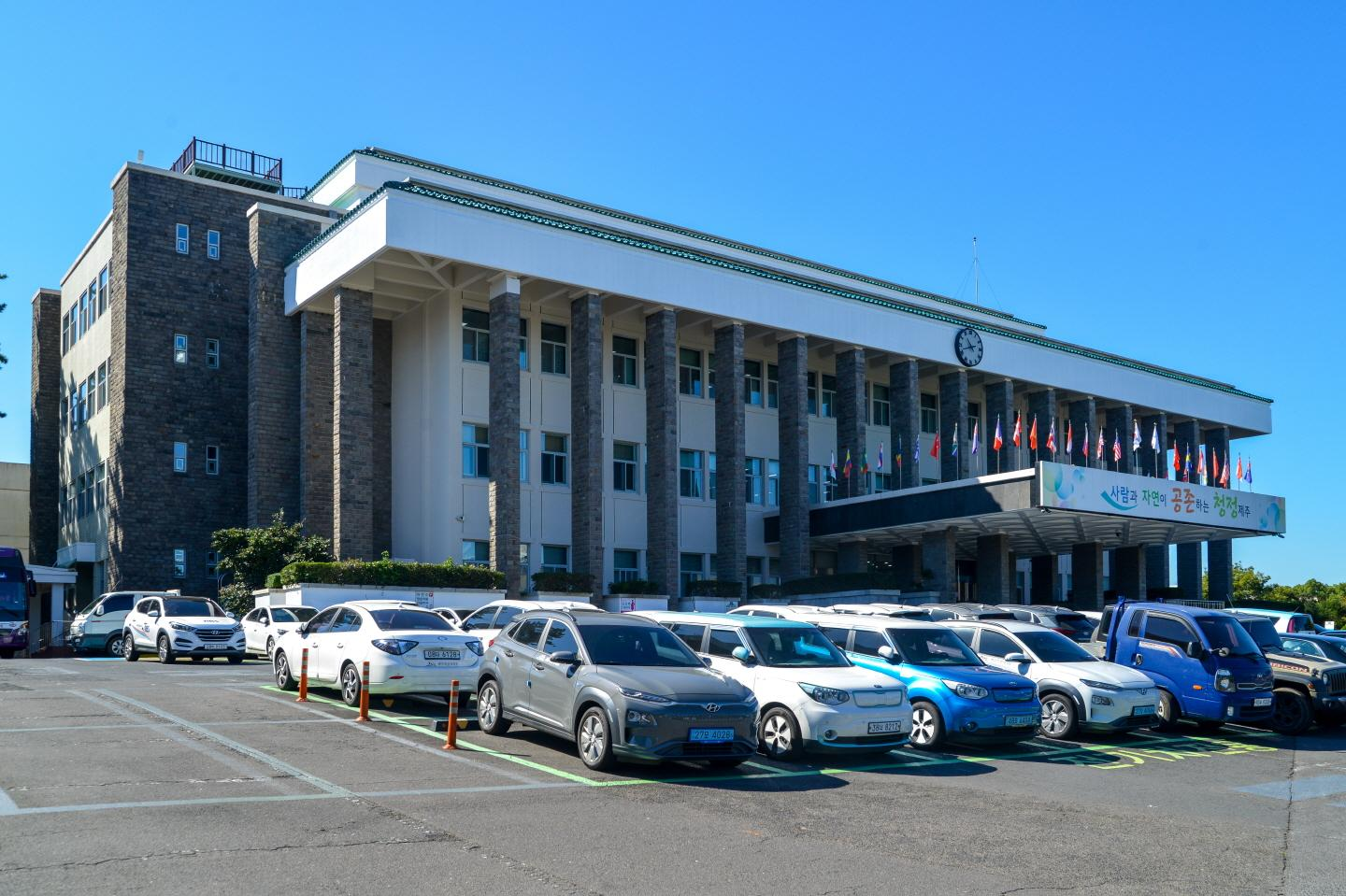
Jeju Provincial Office Main Building

Japan annexed Korea in 1910. In 1915, the gun or county system that had been adopted in 1906 was abolished and Jeju Island was designated as part of the 'island' system and called Jeju myeon under South Jeolla province. In 1931, Jeju-myeon was raised to the status of Jeju-eup or 'township,' which gave the island one township (today's Jeju-si area) and 12 'myeon'. In 1945, Japan relinquished sovereignty over Korea and on 1 September 1955, Jeju Township was elevated to city status with 40 administrative wards, which, on 1 January 1962, were reduced to 14 wards. On 8 July 1956, Seogwi, Daejeong and Hallim-myeons were raised to the status of townships while the southwestern portion of Hallim Township was separated and newly designated as the Hankyeong district (myeon), which gave the province one city, two counties, three townships and 10 myeon or districts with 14 wards in Jeju City. 23 May 1979, saw the restructuring of the Jeju-si wards and the addition of three more, giving 17 wards.

In March 1980, the construction of a new provincial office was started in Yeon-dong of Jeju-si and in December of that year the four myeon of Aewol, Gujwa, Namwon and Seongsan were elevated to the status of townships giving the administrative area one city, two counties, seven townships, six districts and, within Jeju-si, 17 wards.

In 1981, the development of the Jungmun Tourist Complex brought about the unification of Seogwi township and Jungmun-myeon (district) into one as Seogwipo consisting of 12 wards (dong) giving the province two cities, two counties, six townships, five districts and 29 wards. On 1 October 1983, Jeju-si's Samdo ward was divided into two wards to give a total of 30 wards in the province.

Yongdam ward in Jeju-si was restructured into Yongdam ward one and Yongdam ward two on 1 October 1985. On 1 April 1986, Jocheon myeon (district) was elevated to the status of Township and Yeonpyeong-ri Gujwa township was raised to the status of Udo district (myeon). The provincial area now administered 2 cities, 2 counties, 7 townships, 5 districts and 31 wards, the status of the province as of 3 December 1996.

=== Current ===
Until 2005, Jeju Province was divided into two cities (si), Jeju and Seogwipo, and two counties (gun), Bukjeju (North Jeju), and Namjeju (South Jeju), respectively. The two cities were further divided into thirty-one neighborhoods (dong). In contrast, the two counties were split into seven towns (eup) and five districts (myeon). The seven cities and five districts were then divided into 551 villages (ri).

In 2005, Jeju residents approved, by referendum, a proposal to merge Bukjeju County into Jeju City, and Namjeju County into Seogwipo. Effective 1 July 2006, the province was also renamed Jeju Special Self-Governing Province with two minor subdivisions, Jeju City and Seogwipo. In addition to the changes in name, the province was given extensive administrative powers that had previously been reserved for the central government. This is part of a plans to turn Jeju into a "Free International City".

Jeju, on 1 July 2006, was made into the first Self-Governing Province of South Korea.

==== Naming ====
In Korean, do is the phonetic transcription of two distinct hanja (Chinese characters) meaning "island" (島) and "province" (道). However, Jejudo generally refers to the island, while Jeju-do refers to the government administrative unit. The table below also includes the name of Jeju City, the provincial capital.

English name	Korean name	Hangul	Hanja
Jeju Island	Jejudo	제주도	濟州島
Jeju Special Self-Governing Province	Jeju-teukbyeoljachido	제주특별자치도	濟州特別自治道
Jeju Province	Jeju-do	제주도	濟州道
Jeju City	Jeju-si	제주시	濟州市

==== National Assembly constituencies ====
Jeju is represented by 3 constituencies in the National Assembly of South Korea: Jeju-gap, Jeju-eul (in Jeju City) and Seogwipo.

=== Cities ===
Map	#	Name	Hangul	Hanja	Population (2013)	Subdivisions
— Administrative City —
	1	Jeju	제주시	濟州市	445,457	4 eup, 3 myeon, 19 haengjeong-dong
	2	Seogwipo	서귀포시	西歸浦市	159,213	3 eup, 2 myeon, 12 haengjeong-dong

=== Symbols ===
- Provincial flower: Rhododendron (Rhododendron weyrichii (Chamkkot)
- Provincial tree: Camphor laurel (Cinnamomum camphora (Noknamu)
- Provincial bird: White-backed woodpecker (Dendrocopos leucotos quelpartensis)

== Society and culture ==
=== Dol hareubang ===
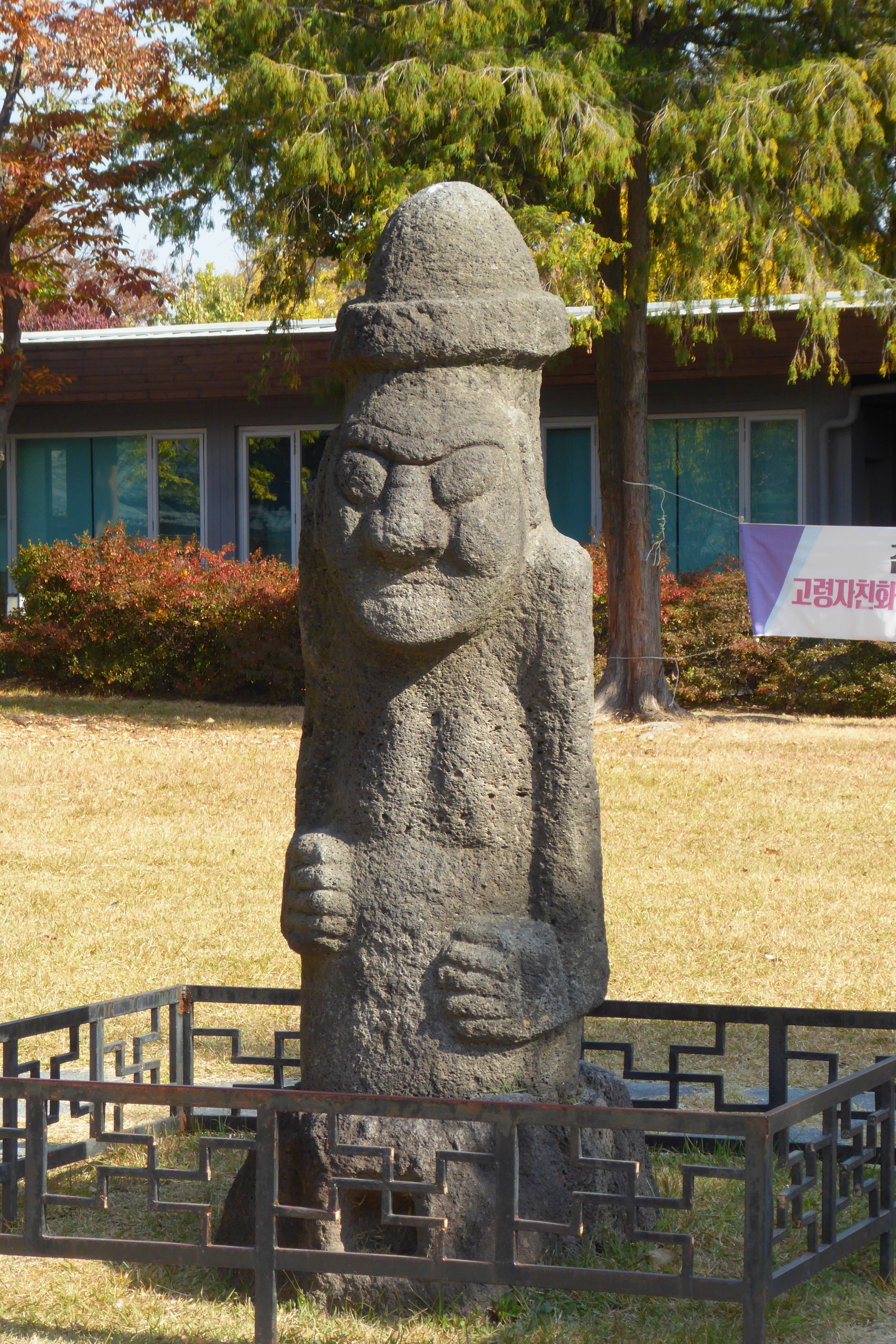
A pre-modern dol hareubang, now at the National Folk Museum of Korea in Seoul.

Dol hareubang (lit. 'stone grandfather[s]') are statues that were placed in front of gates as symbolic projections of power and guardians against evil spirits. They have also become symbols and ritual objects for fertility; there are rituals involving the noses of the statues being touched or consumed to improve fertility. They have since become widely adopted as symbols of Jeju Island. It is unclear when they first began to be made; there are attestations to statues similar to them from around 500 years ago, in the early Joseon period. There are 47 pre-modern dol hareubang remaining. Modern versions of the statues have been created, with some being sold as tourist goods.

=== Doldam ===
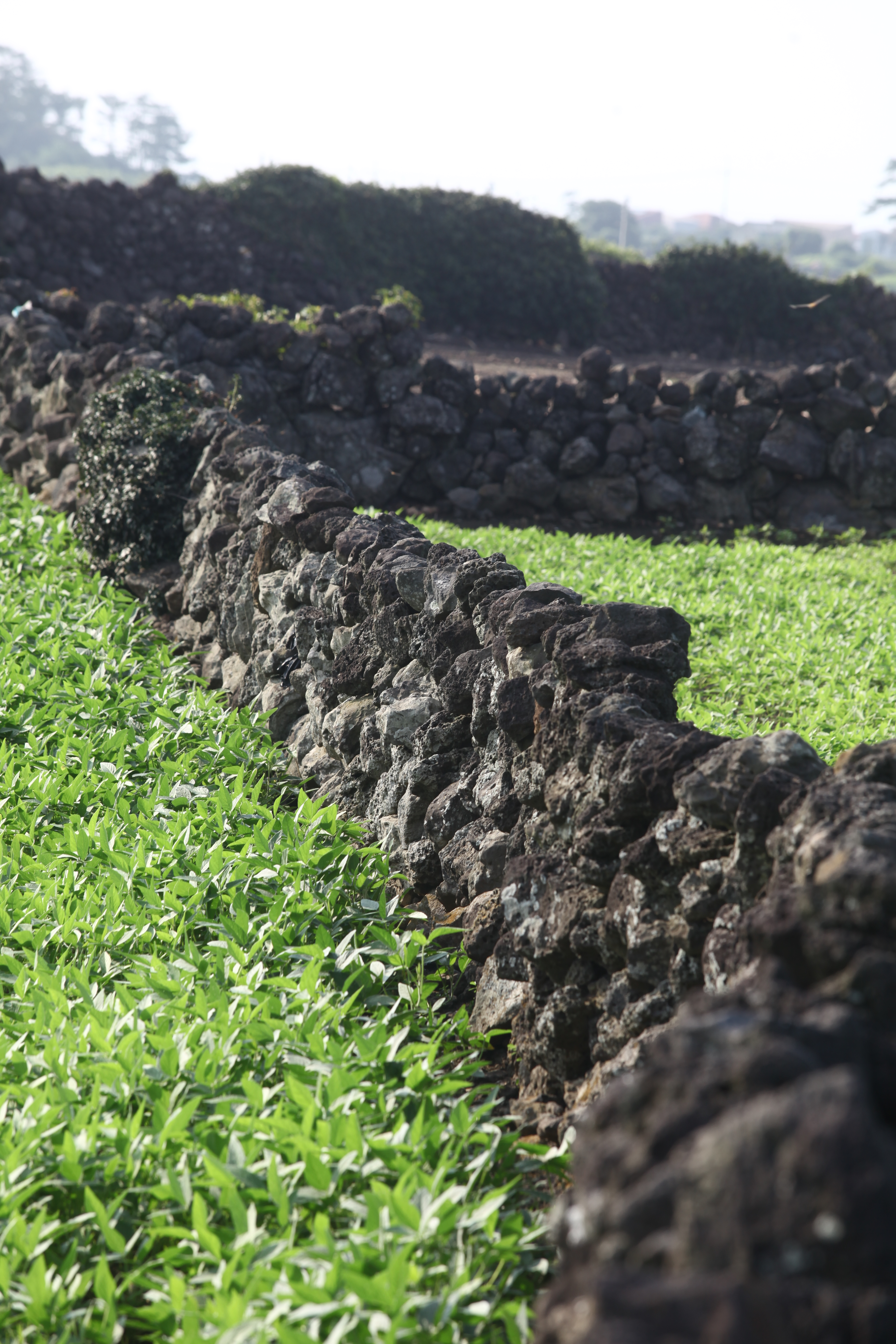
Doldam walls around fields, called batdam (2014)

Doldam refers to the traditional use of piled volcanic stones, often without any adhesives between them, on Jeju Island. Various structures, namely walls around fields (called batdam) are created. It is considered a skill to be able to create a resilient doldam structure, using only gravity and the angular shapes of the rocks, that can resist Jeju's strong winds. Such structures can be found throughout Jeju, and are used for a wide variety of purposes.

==== Bangsatap ====
Bangsatap are ritual doldam structures meant to ward off evil spirits and misfortune. They are usually around 2 to 3 m (7 to 10 ft) tall, and usually have an object placed on top (usually a wood or stone sculpture of a bird or a person). They are generally placed in communities, in an area determined by feng shui or placed where misfortune was thought to be likely. A 2022 news article claimed that 49 pre-modern bangsatap were left on the island, although before the mid-20th century they were considered to be widespread.

=== Jeongnang ===
Jeongnang are traditional entrance gates to private homes on the island. The gates are typically composed of three parallel wooden poles placed in holes in wood or stone pillars. They have a number of purposes, one of which is to quickly communicate to neighbors where the owner of the house is. If all three poles are lowered on one side, the owner of the house is at home. Raising poles expresses degrees of how far away from home the owner is; three raised poles indicates that the owner will be gone for a long time. Jeongnang have become increasingly less common, especially as more Jejuans have moved into apartments. In spite of this, the practice is still maintained in rural areas.

=== Matriarchical family structure and haenyeo ===
Another distinct aspect of Jeju is the matriarchal family structure, found especially in Udo and Mara, but also present in the rest of the province. The best-known example of this is found among the haenyeo ("sea women"), who were often the heads of families, because they controlled the income. They earned their living from freediving, often all year round in quite cold water without scuba gear, in order to harvest abalones, conches, and a myriad of other marine products. It is thought that women are better at spending all day deep-water diving because they resist the cold better. In the early 1960s, 21% of women on the island were free divers, providing 60% of the island's fisheries revenue. However, because of rapid economic development and modernization, as of 2014 only about 4,500 haenyeo, most aged over 60, were still actively working.

== Demographics ==
Historical population
Year	Pop.	±%
1949	254,527	—
1960	281,663	+10.7%
1970	358,085	+27.1%
1980	462,941	+29.3%
1990	514,605	+11.2%
2000	513,260	−0.3%
2010	531,905	+3.6%
2020	670,858	+26.1%

Jeju Province is the least populous province in South Korea; at the end of September 2020, the total resident registration population is 672,948, of which 4,000 of the total provincial population reside on outlying islands such as the Chuja Islands and Udo. The total area of the province is 1,849 km^{2} (714 sq mi).

=== Religion ===
Religion in Jeju (2024)
1. Not religious (52.0%)
2. Buddhism (19.0%)
3. Protestantism (17.0%)
4. Catholicism (11.0%)
5. Others (2.00%)

According to the census of 2005, of the people of Jeju 32.7% follow Buddhism and 17.5% follow Christianity (10.3% Protestantism and 7.2% Catholicism). 49.8% of the population is mostly not religious or follows Korean Shamanism.

=== Refugees on Jeju Island ===
In 2018, 500 refugees fleeing the civil war in Yemen came to Jeju Island, causing unease and racial tensions among the residents of Jeju Island.

== Sports ==
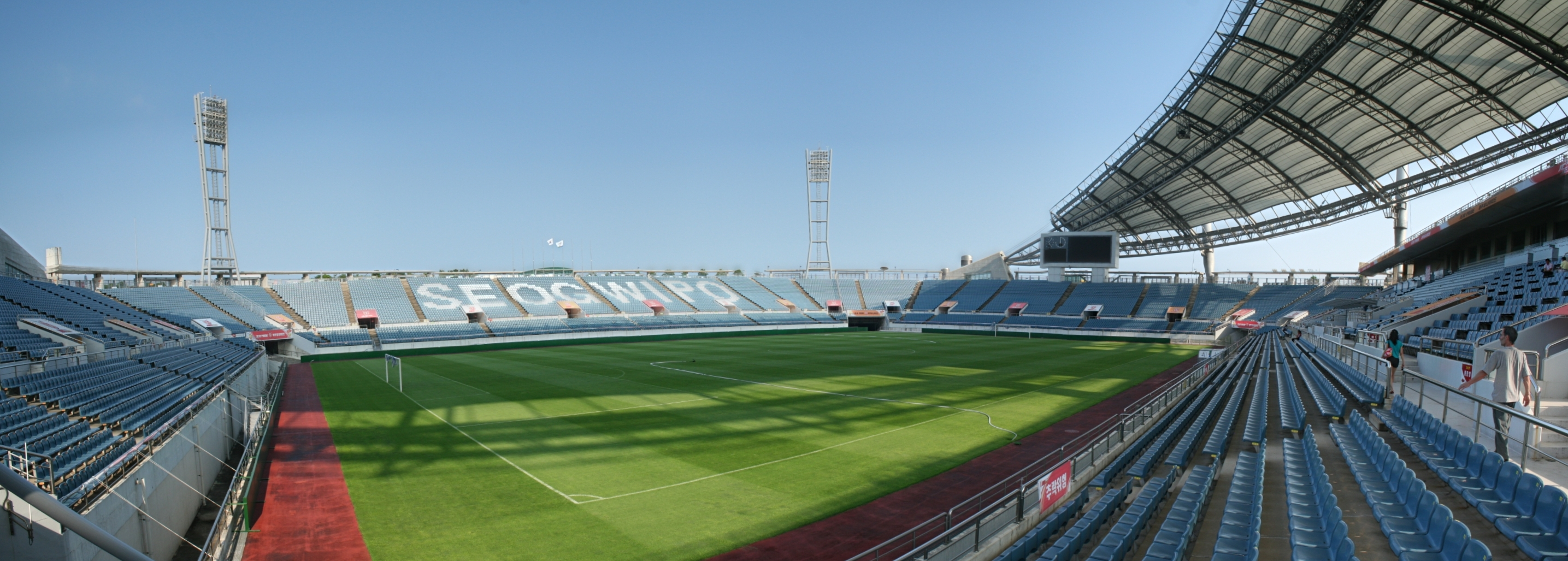
Jeju World Cup Stadium.

=== International competitions ===
Jeju Island served as one of the host cities of the 2002 FIFA World Cup, with matches hosted at Jeju World Cup Stadium. Jeju City hosted the AIBA 2014 Women's World Boxing Championships at the Halla Gymnasium.

=== Association football ===
Jeju SK (known as Jeju United prior to 2025) is the only professional sports club on Jeju-do. They were the runners-up of the K League in 2010.

== Cuisine ==
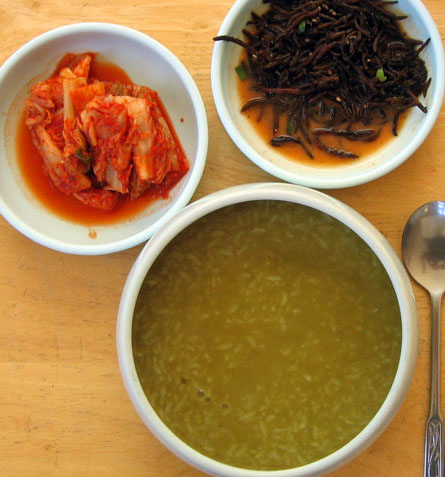
Jeonbokjuk, abalone porridge

Jeju Island is the southernmost and largest island isolated from the Korean peninsula. Due to its lack of fresh water, paddy farming is only done on a small scale, with the cultivation of cereal crops such as millet, barnyard millet, buckwheat, and barley being the main feature of agriculture. Therefore, the traditional Jeju meal generally consists of japgokbap, which is a bowl of steamed multiple grains as a main dish, with salted dried fish called jaban as banchan (side dishes), and a soup based on doenjang (soybean paste) such as baechuguk made with Napa cabbage, kongnipguk made with soybean leaves, or muguk made with radish. Jeju dishes are made with simple ingredients, and the taste is generally salty.

Raw seafood called hoe is commonly consumed as a part of the meal. The warm weather affects Jeju cuisine in that gimjang, preparing kimchi in late autumn for winter consumption, is not necessary to Jeju, as it is in the other provinces. Only a small amount of kimchi is pickled by Jeju locals. Representative main dishes in Jeju cuisine are porridge made with fish, seafood, seaweed, or mushrooms. Examples include jeonbokjuk made with abalone, okdomjuk made with red tilefish, gingijuk (Jeju: 깅잇죽/겡잇죽; 게죽) made with small crabs called bangge (Helice tridens), maeyeoksae juk made with young miyeok (미역) (wakame), and chogijuk made with shiitake.

Gamgyul is a type of orange similar to the Mandarin orange or tangerine, commonly harvested in Jeju Island. Black pig is a delicacy on the island as well. Black pigs are famous for their black hair and their meat for its chewy texture. The meat is nutritious and does not have the unique smell of pork. Black pigs' other notable features are their long faces, narrow snouts and small ears that stand up. Horse meat is also a delicacy of the island.

== Myths and legends ==
Within the Jeju province, numerous mythological tales and legends remain particularly prevalent; these are encompassed by the word yetmal (옛말; lit. 'old language'), responsible for conveying the entirety of the substance of a myth or folk tale, which, within the large majority of instances, occurs within the form of a proverb or philosophical statement. The aforementioned stories remain disseminated within the form of prose between speaker and listener, constituting oral tradition; each story contains a component of truth derived from events within the Jeju province. A. This fictional story could be oral literature but in the eye of ideological aspect, the story also becomes a philosophy. These stories may be classified as proverbs, philosophical statements or folklore derived from the history of the island.

The characteristics of the stories of Jeju Province can be found within the form of natural and historical legend; for instance, within the Ahunahopgol legend (아흔아홉골 전설; lit. 'legend of 99 valleys'), historical circumstances responsible for a lack of individuals with talent within leadership remains displayed, expressing the geometrical destiny perspective. The historical legends of the province generally concerned an individual of particular strength; however, the limitations of the island remain represented within the form of the alternative to the hero, the starving strong man. A primary example remains the malmurlee legend (말머리전설; lit. 'head of horse'); This kind of story shows the limit of the people of the province, with the primary character remaining born as a strong hero as previously listed, yet remaining incapable of overcoming historical isolation.

A particular example of mythology within the province remains the myth of Seolmundae Halmang, well known within Jeju; according to this myth, Seolmundae Halmang ("Grandmother Seolmundae") could reach from Seongsan Ilchulbong ("Sunrise Peak", a volcanic tuff cone on the seaboard of Jeju Island) to Guan Tal island at Aewol-eup in a single stride and to Hallasan within 2 strides. She was very strong, possessed 500 children and built Hallasan with seven scoops of earth. One day, Seolmundae Halmang was making soup for her sons while they were out hunting; while they were gone, she fell into the pot and drowned. On their return, they hungrily ate the soup, without knowing that it contained their mother; however, the youngest son knew, informing the remainder of the family, with the entirety of the family crying and transforming into 500 stones.

== Economy ==
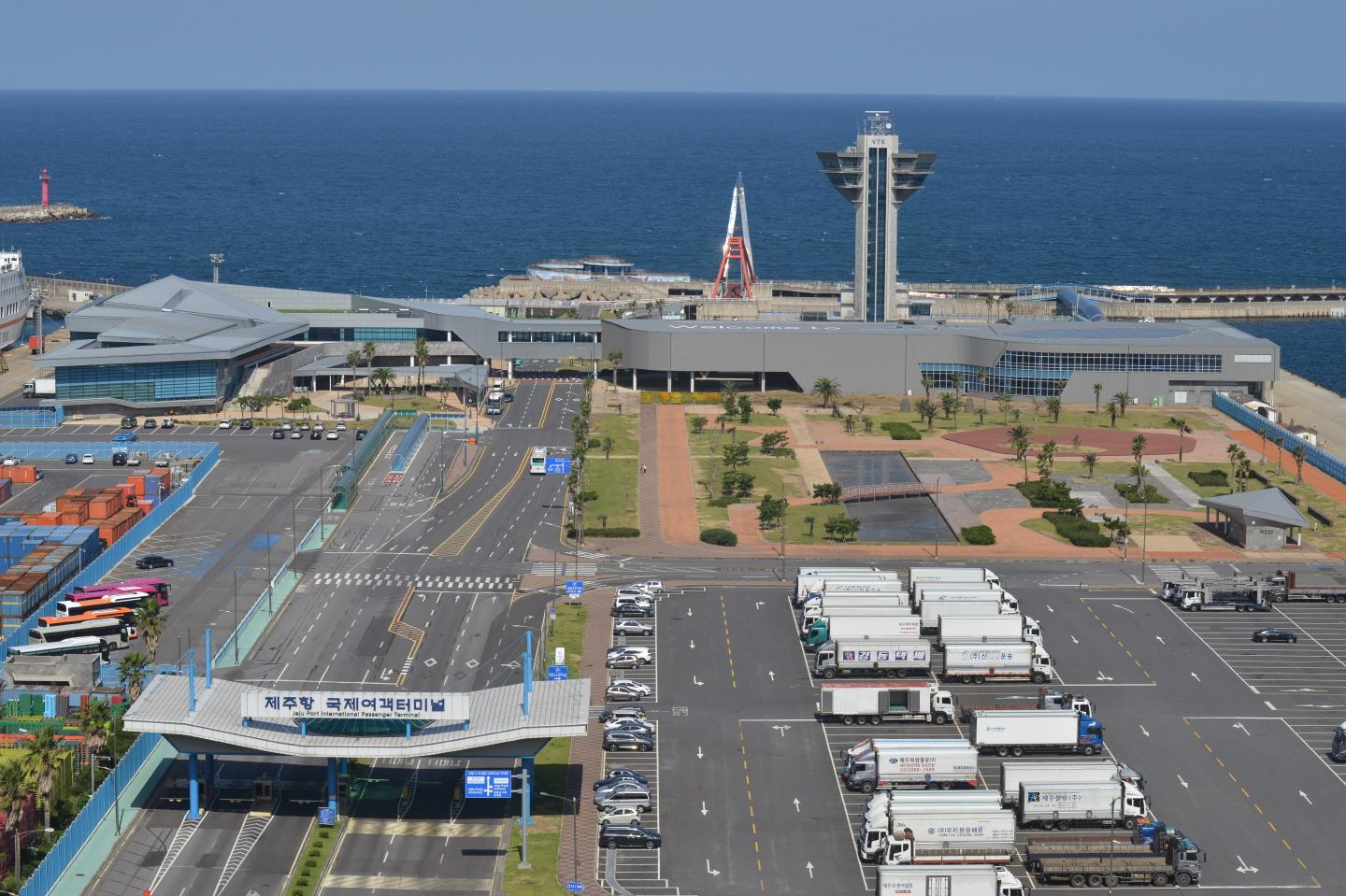
Jeju Port

The Jeju economy has traditionally been supported by primary industry, agriculture and fishing, but tourism has taken a more and more important role as the island receives ten million visitors per year. These are mostly Korean mainlanders but through the opening of the 2010 decade hundreds of thousands of Chinese tourists have been arriving and the number is increasing.

In 2006, the GDP of the province was projected at 8.5 trillion won (about US$8.5 billion), approximately 15 million won per capita. The provincial government's budget for 2006 was projected at 1.1 trillion won, an increase of 10% over 2005.

Jeju is also a home for key functions of Daum Communications, a leading Korean internet site, and sole owner of Lycos until August 2010.

Jeju is also famous for hosting many conferences and international meetings, including the World Scout Conference in July 2008. Jeju has its own international convention center called ICC Jeju. The ASEAN-KOREA Commemorative Summit 2009 was held at ICC Jeju.

In 2010, the South Korean federal government tasked Jeju Island to develop itself as an international Meetings, Incentives, Conferencing, Exhibitions destination, and since then, the island has hosted a number of notable events such as the 10,000-passenger China Baozhen Group incentive and 8,000-passenger Amway South Korean incentive. In 2010, the destination welcomed 67 events, enabling it to reach 27th spot globally and seventh in Asia in the UIA ranking of global meetings destinations.

== Tourism ==
Jeju Stone Statue Park Statue.

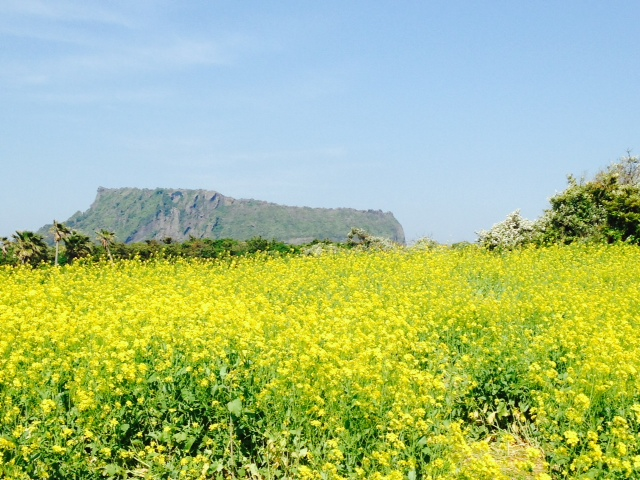
Rapeseed fields in Jeju Island

Tourism commands a large fraction of Jeju's economy. In 2018, it was reported that Jeju's service industry was around 73.7% of the island's GRDP. Jeju's temperate climate, natural scenery, and beaches make it a popular tourist destination for South Koreans as well as visitors from other parts of East Asia. The island is sometimes called "South Korea's Hawaii". Tourism on the island is promoted by the South Korean government–backed corporation Jeju Tourism Organization.

The most popular tourist spots on the island are Cheonjeyeon and Cheonjiyeon waterfalls, Hallasan, Hyeobje cave, and Hyeongje island. There is a variety of leisure sports that tourists can take part in Jeju including golf, horse riding, hunting, fishing, mountain climbing, etc. Depending on the season, Jeju hosts many festivals for tourists including a penguin swimming contest in winter, cherry blossom festival in spring, the midsummer night beach festival in summer, and Jeju horse festival in autumn, among others. For most tourists, traffic to and from the island is mainly taken through Jeju International Airport and transport within the island by rental cars. Some local products are popular with tourists, including Jeju's special tile fish and mandarin oranges, as well as souvenirs and duty-free shopping.

Jeju was chosen as one of the New 7 Wonders of Nature through the New 7 Wonders of Nature campaign by the New7Wonders Foundation. The campaign saw hundreds of millions of votes and the top seven wonders were announced on 11/11/11.

Museums on the island include Nexon Computer Museum.

=== Tourism ===
In 1962, the South Korean government established the Korean National Tourism Corporation (KNTC) to monitor and regulate internal and external tourism, and it was later renamed the Korean National Tourism Organization (KNTO). While Korea lacks abundant natural resources, tourism generates income nationwide for South Korea. In Jeju-do province, specifically, tourism has proven to be beneficial and has been a growing contributor to the economy. Jeju Island, often compared to Hawaii, "is the winter destination for Asian tourist seeking warm weather and beautiful beaches."

The island is home to 660,000 people, but hosts 15,000,000 visitors per year. English is not widely spoken in Jeju, and as a matter of fact, "the local dialect is different enough from Korean that it is recognized as a distinct language." "Until recently, Chinese travelers accounted for 80% of foreign travelers"; however, due to the installation of THAAD (The Terminal High Altitude Area Defense) system in Korea, Chinese travel has dwindled drastically. "THAAD is supposed to shield against North Korean missiles" however China views it as a security threat. Though in the past year [2017] tourism has declined sharply, visits to Jeju continue to be a vacation destination for Asia. There are no visa requirements for visitors staying up to 90 days and future plans to build a second international airport have been discussed. Due to the decline of visitors caused by China's travel ban to Korea due to the concern of THAAD, talks and discussions continue to be held regarding a second airport to service over 45 million people with an anticipated completion by 2035. The current Jeju International Airport is crowded, as it services "30 million, which is 4 million more than it was designed to handle." The current desire of the existing Jeju International Airport includes wanting to add more direct flights, nonstop to major cities including Tokyo, Osaka, Beijing, Shanghai, and Taipei.

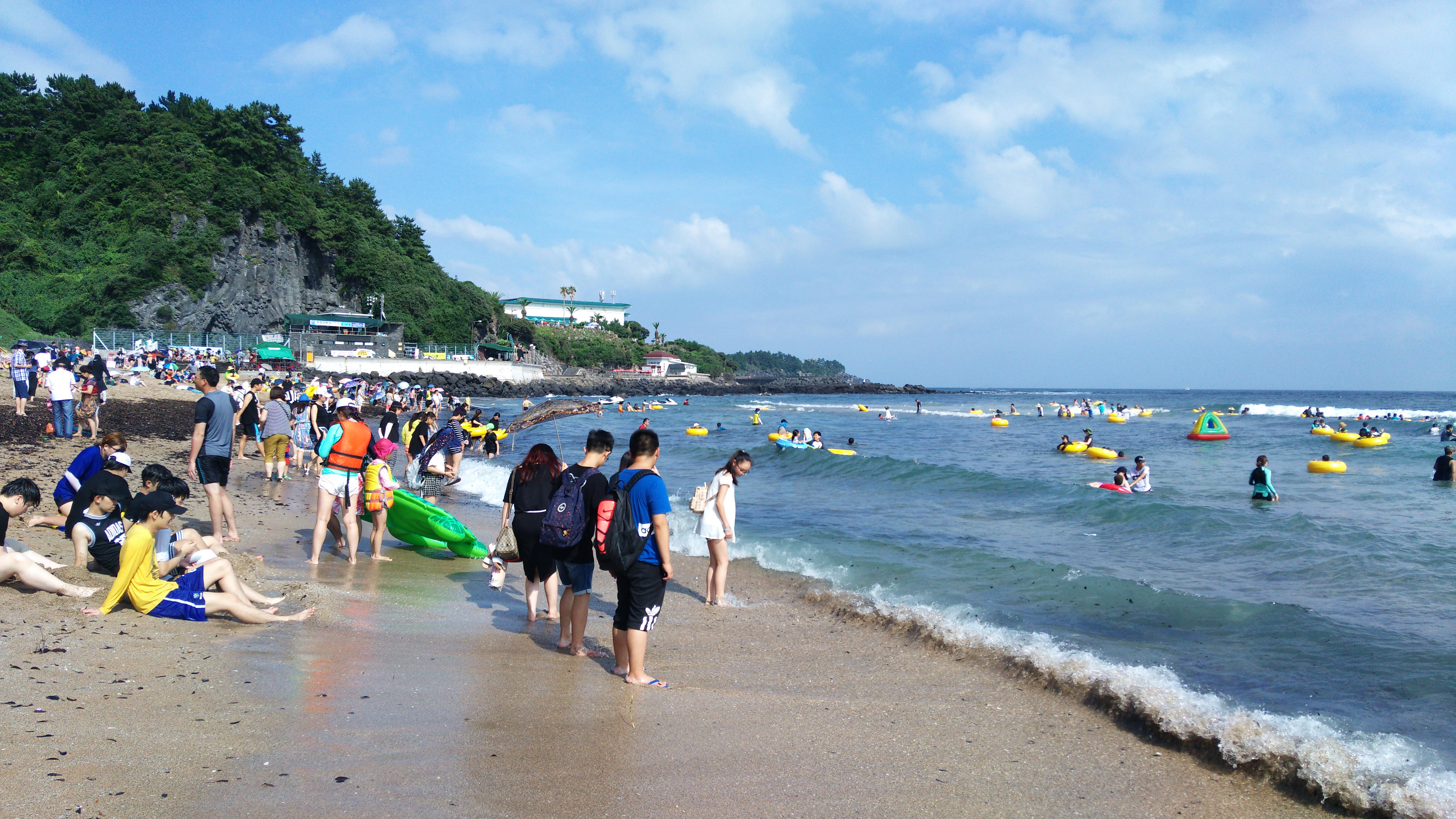
Beach on Jeju

While the economy booms with foreign travel, residents suffer negative repercussions of Jeju tourism. "Most commercial facilities are owned by foreigners and major companies." In addition to increasing tourism, issues such as beach pollution, traffic, and overconsumption of underground water present a problem.

Due to extensive tourism, the pollution of beaches has become a serious problem. The local government of Jeju aspires to be carbon-free by 2030. "Nearly half of all-electric cars in South Korea are registered in Jeju".

In addition to the aspirations of an additional airport and the expansion of tourism on the island, Jeju is home to a small technological hub. In 2005, the Jeju Science Park was created, a complex for technology companies and organizations. Since its implementation, it has attracted 117 IT and biotech companies and is home to the Daum Kakao Corporation headquarters.

Jeju became more well known outside Korea after two characters in the 2021 Netflix original series Squid Game mentioned it. It was also the location for two episodes of the 2022 Netflix original series Extraordinary Attorney Woo, entitled "The Blue Night of Jeju I and II".

==== Tourist attractions ====
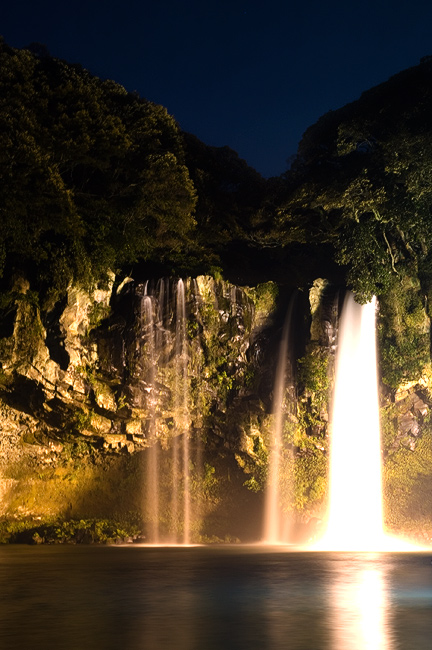
Cheonjiyeon Waterfall in Jeju

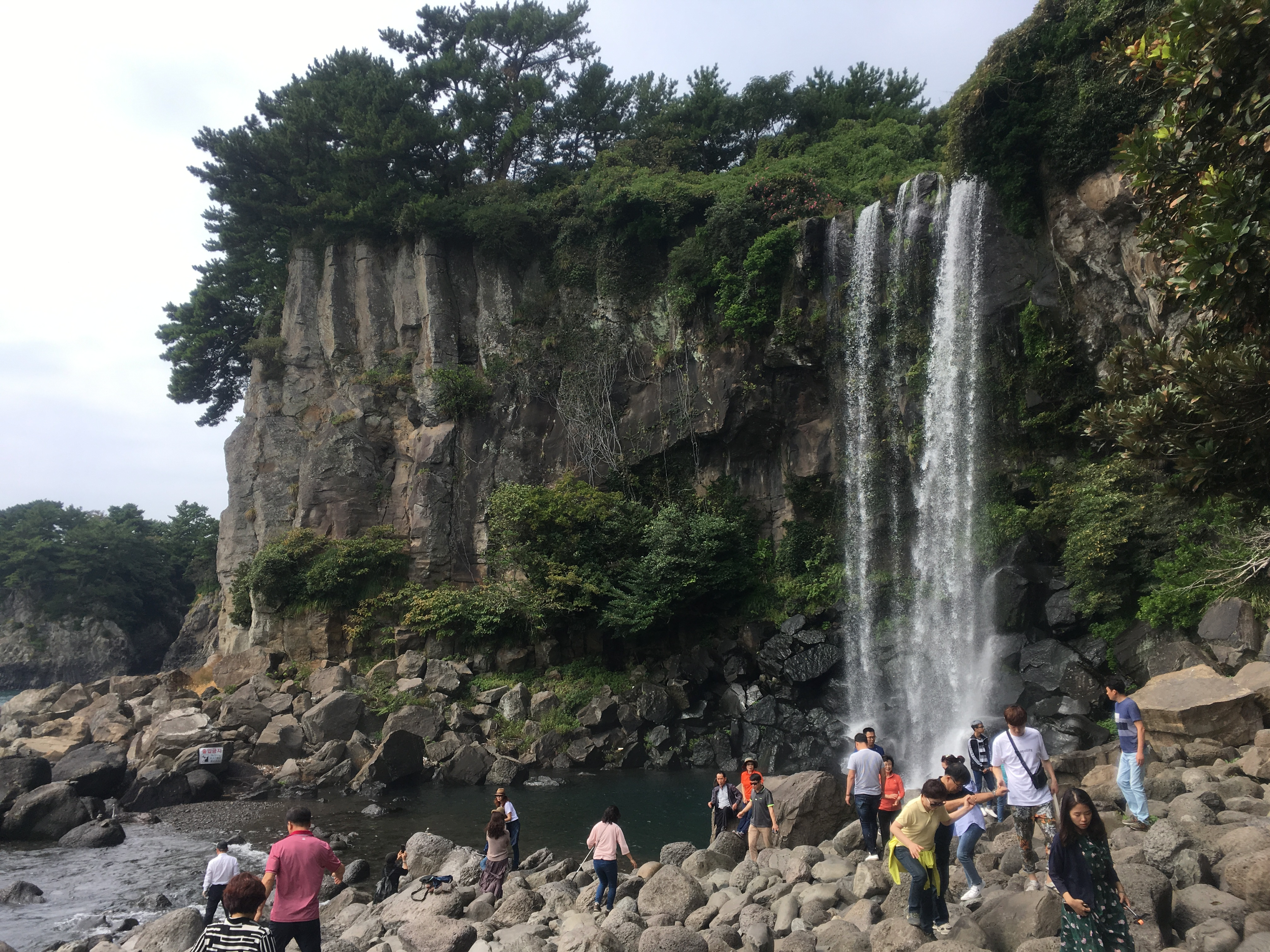
Jeongbang Waterfall in Jeju

Hallim Park is one of the oldest and most popular tourist attractions on Jeju. It is on the west coast.

There is an annual fire festival on the island that stems from a custom of removing harmful insects and old grass in villages in winter. The fire festival is held on the fifteenth day of the first lunar month. Dal-gip (to pile up much wood) is burned when the moon rises while praying for good harvests and making good wishes. Jeju traditional food is eaten at the site of the festival. This festival was held 13 times until 2009. The "Jeju Jeongwol Daeboreum Fire Festival" started in 1997 and become a leading festival of Jeju. This takes place in Saebyeol Oreum in Bongseong ri, Aewol Eup. It takes up to 25 minutes to reach it from Jeju International Airport by car. Jeju citizens do their utmost to prepare the Fire Festival so as to pass down, develop, and ultimately develop branding for the unique folk culture resources of Jeju.

Saebyeol oreum has a characteristic of a complex volcano. It has a horseshoe-shaped crater that is both very wide and slightly split. It rises high with the little peaks making an oval from the south peak to northwest. The scale is above sea level 519.3 meters (1,704 ft), height of 119 m (390 ft), circumference of 2,713 m (8,901 ft), area of 522,216 m^{2} (0.201629 sq mi). Saebyeol oreum is the middle size among the 360 oreums on Jeju Island. It is named after the saying "it brightens like a star."

Olle is a word in the local dialect that refers to the paths between houses and public roads.

The Jeju Olle Trail, called Jeju Olle Gil or simply "jejuolle" in Korean, is a long-distance footpath on Jeju Island. The course, mostly following the coastline, consists of 21 connected, numbered main courses, 5 major spurs, and a short spur that connects to Jeju Airport. The courses have an average length of 16 kilometers (9.9 mi) and all together total 404 km (251 mi). The exact length and locations change over time as trails are modified or re-routed.

The courses pass through small villages, cross beaches, wind through farms and orchards, twist through forests, and climb oreums ("low parasitic volcanoes") across Jeju Island.

Manjanggul is one of the longest lava tubes in the world. Manjang Cave, at Donggimnyeong-ri, Gujwa-eup, North Jeju, 30 km (19 mi) east of Jeju City, was designated as Natural Monument No. 98 on 28 March 1970. The annual temperature inside the cave ranges from 11 °C to 21 °C, thus facilitating a favorable environment throughout the year.

The cave is academically significant as rare species live in the cave. Created by spewing lava, "the lava turtle", "lava pillar", and "wing-shaped wall" look like the work of the gods. It is considered to be a world-class tourist attraction.

The Geomunoreum lava tube system the most significant series of protected lava tubes in the world and includes an array of secondary carbonate speleothems (stalactites and other formations). It overwhelms other lava tubes with its abundance and diversity. The Geomunoreum lava tube system, which is regarded as the finest such cave system in the world, has a visual impact even for those experienced with such phenomena. It displays the spectacle of multi-colored carbonate decorations adorning the roofs and floors, and dark-colored lava walls, partially covered by a mural of carbonate deposits.

In addition, lava tubes are like those in limestone karst in scale, shape, and internal decoration, but completely different in origin. Lava tubes are known from basaltic terrain in most of the world's volcanic regions. The lava tubes of the Geomunoreum system are, however, regarded as internationally important due to their length, massive volume, intricate passage configuration, well preserved internal lava features, abundant and spectacular secondary carbonate formations, ease of access, and their scientific and educational values. Another feature making Geomunoreum globally significant and distinctive is the presence of carbonate deposits and formations. Very small deposits of calcite are common in lava tubes and are more significantly developed as speleothems in Duck Creek cave in the U.S. state of Utah. However, in abundance, density and diversity they are far less impressive than those of Yongcheongul and Dangcheomuldonggul lava tubes in Jeju, and the scale of these decorations within the lava caves of Jeju Island far exceeds any other comparable examples. The nomination is supported by the Commission on Volcanic Caves of the International Union of Speleology — the world's most authoritative scientific body on volcanic caves — which regards Jeju's lava caves as being of the highest international ranking. Yongcheon Gul Lava Tube has been discovered subsequently and is of equivalent value.

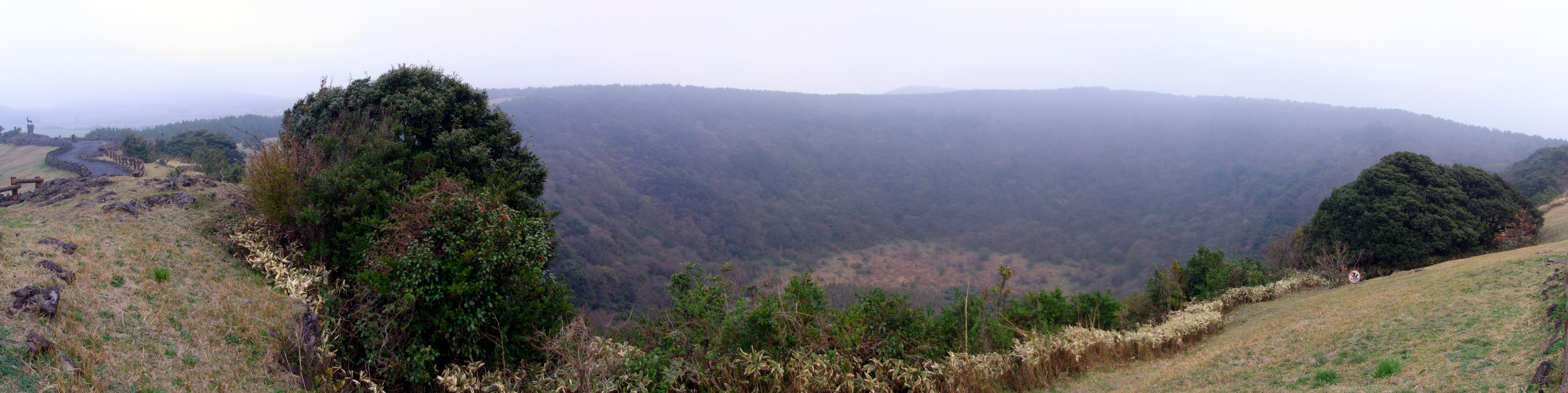
Sangumburi volcanic crater

Sangumburi Crater is the crater of an extinct volcano. Unlike its brethren Halla-san and Songsan Ilch'ubong, this one exploded quickly but did not spew much lava nor did it form much of a surrounding cone. This phenomenon is called maru in Korean, and Sangumburi is the only one of its kind in the country, making it Natural Monument #263. The remaining crater is 100 m (330 ft) deep and an average of 350 m (1,150 ft)s across. Over 400 species of plants and animals live inside the crater.

Visitors can walk around part of the rim (the rest is private property and fenced off), but they cannot venture down inside the crater. A well-paved path leads from the parking area to the viewing area, which has a small pavilion and several vista points. Also on the grounds are gravesites made in traditional Jeju fashion: a wide, trapezoidal stone wall surrounding the burial mound. Several of the sites have small stone figures that guard the mound against evil spirits. At the park entrance are large rocks from the crater. During the eruption, molten rock flew from the volcano into the air and cooled into many exotic shapes.

Seongsan Ilchulbong, also called 'Sunrise Peak', is an archetypal tuff cone formed by hydrovolcanic eruptions upon a shallow seabed about 5,000 years ago. On the eastern seaboard of Jeju Island and said to resemble a gigantic ancient castle, this tuff cone is 182 meters high, has a preserved bowl-like crater, and displays diverse inner structures resulting from the sea cliff. These features are considered to be of geologic worth, providing information on eruptive and depositional processes of hydromagnetic volcanoes worldwide as well as past volcanic activity of Seongsan Ilchulbong itself.

Oedolgae is a 20-meter-tall pillar-shaped rock near the hill Sammaebong in Seogwipo. It was created 1.5 million years ago by a volcanic eruption. At the top of Oedolgae, there are pine trees growing naturally. According to legend, an old woman became a rock after waiting for her husband who went to sea to catch fish and didn't return for a long time. So people call it 'halmang bawi' meaning grandmother rock. On the left side of Oedolgae, there is a rock called someri bawi. A large grass area covers the rock, and the surrounding area is great for fishing. Oedolgae is a popular tourist destination, particularly with foreigners.

Hallasan is the mountain of one of the three gods. It stands at the center of Jeju Island, spreading east and west. The east face is steep, the north side is gentle, and the east and west form a flat, wide highland. Hallasan is a dormant volcano created by volcanic activities during the quaternary period of the Cenozoic era. It is primarily covered with basalt. On its top is a crater and Baeknok Lake. This mountain is home to alpine plants and houses as many as 1,800 species of flora. It also boasts luxuriant natural forests and vast grasslands.

The 43-kilometer (27 mi) long Road 5.16 crossing the eastern waist of the mountain from Jeju City to Seogwipo is considered to be one of the best tourist roads in Korea. Along this road, there are many tourist attractions such as Sancheondan and Seongpanak. People can enjoy the royal azalea blossoms in spring, lush, green woods in summer, colorful foliage in fall, and a landscape of snow in winter.

The 37-kilometer-long (23 mi) Road 110 crossing the western waist of the mountain from Jeju-si to Jungmun runs through a high area that is 1,100 meters (3,600 ft) high above sea level. It passes by the Eoseungsang Reservoir, which is a source of water for Jeju islanders. The 99 Passes where, a legend says, neither a king nor a tiger is born because it is one short to 100 passes. It also passes closely by Youngsil Giam (Youngsil Grotesque Rocks). It is possible to climb up to Wetse Oreum along Eorimok Trail and Youngsil Trail and to the top along Seongpanak Trail and Kwaneumsa Temple Trail.

Udo, (also called U-island, since do means island) is on the northeast of Seongsan-ri, 3.5 kilometres (2.2 miles) off the coast. This is the largest of the islands included in Jeju-si. Udo, literally "Cow Island" in Chinese, has this name because it looks like a cow lying down. The whole of Udo is a lava plateau and a fertile flatland where major agricultural products such as sweet potatoes, garlic, and peanuts are produced. There is a parasitic cone, called shoi meori oreum, in the southeast.

Jungmun Saekdal Beach is at the Saekdal-dong, Seogwipo. It is near the hotel zone it has convenient accessibility: Sinla Jeju hotel, Lotte hotel, Jeju Hana hotel are around 2 kilometers near the beach. Jungmun Saekdal Beach has a particular geographical feature. The beach shore is faced to the north and the water level is steady knee height until about 200 meters off the shore. There are many big and small waves under the influences of the Maparam (Korean: 마파람, which means the wind from the north in Korean) so the beach is clouded by the people who came from many other regions to enjoy surfing in summer.

Aqua Planet Jeju In Seogwipo, there is the largest public aquarium "Aqua Planet Jeju" (아쿠 아플라넷 제주) in South Korea. Korea's largest tank of 5,300 m^{3} (1,400,000 US gal) "The Sea of Jeju" is popular.

Jeju has three UNESCO World Heritage sites, and is "packed with museums and theme parks and also has horses, mountains, lava tube caves, and waterfalls with clear blue ocean lapping its beaches." The Haenyeo (Jeju female divers) harvest oysters, abalone, clams, seaweed and other marine life, and their history is showcased at the island's Haenyeo museum.

One of the most popular surfing spots in Korea, Jeju Island is also the birthplace of Korean surfing. Some famous beaches are Weoljung Beach and Jungmun Beach. The latter is home to the first surfing club in Korea, established in 1995.

There are small islands near Jeju Island that visitors can visit by boat; the most famous of these are Udo, Gapado, and Marado. Udo is famous for its peanut ice cream and boat tours.

===== Places of interest =====
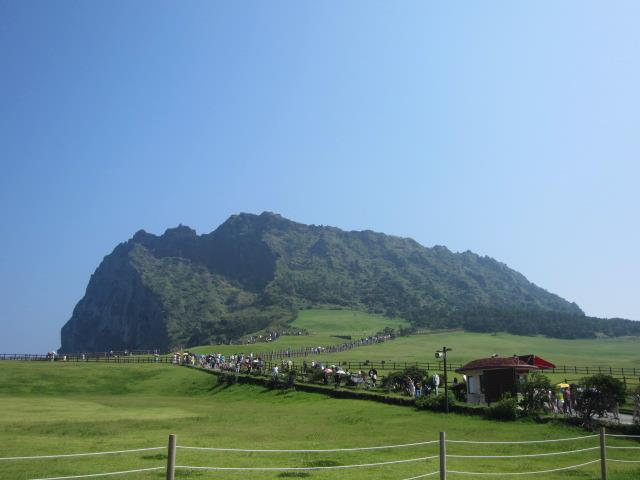
Seongsan Ilchulbong or "Sunrise Peak"

- Love Land (South Korea), an outdoor sculpture park focused on a theme of sex
- Manjanggul Lava Tube, 8 km (5 mile) long with a 1 km (1000 yard) publicly accessible portion
- Seongsan Ilchulbong or "Sunrise Peak", a volcanic tuff cone and crater
- Hallasan, the island's central dominant peak
- Mount Songaksan, a shore cliff and a low, flat grassland make a beautiful and easy walking trail
- Seongeup Folk Village
- Jeju Teddy's Bear Museum
- Figure Museum Jeju
- Jeju Maze Park
- Mysterious Road
- Water Falls (Jeongbang. Cheonjiyeon. Cheonjeyeon)
- O'Sulloc Tea Museum
- Beach (Jungmun. Hyeopjae)
- Ecoland Train Trip Theme Parks
- Natural Recreation Forest Jeolmul
- Jonjaamji, Korean Buddhist pagoda

==== Visa policy ====
Jeju has an independent visa policy that varies from that of the South Korean mainland. So all ordinary passport holders excluding those from Afghanistan, Cuba, Ghana, Iraq, Kosovo, Libya, Nigeria, Palestine, North Korea, Sudan, Syria, Somalia and Yemen can stay visa-free 30 days in Jeju, even if they normally require a visa for the South Korean mainland. Domestic flights from the mainland do not require identification; however, passengers who try to enter the mainland from Jeju must bring identification such as National ID Card, Jeju Resident Card, South Korean drivers licence issued by National Police Agency or Jeju Municipal Police Agency or passport with proper visa or visa-free passport or passport with valid United States visa.

Thus, all ordinary passport holders except the following can stay visa-free 30 days in Jeju Province, even if they normally require a visa for South Korea:

- Afghanistan
- Bangladesh
- Cameroon
- Cuba
- Egypt
- Gambia
- Ghana
- Iran
- Iraq
- Kosovo
- Kyrgyzstan
- Myanmar
- Nepal
- Nigeria
- Pakistan
- Palestine
- Senegal
- Somalia
- Sri Lanka
- Sudan
- Syria
- Uzbekistan
- Yemen

Tourists from China do not require a visa to visit Jeju, unlike the rest of South Korea, and in the 2010s have started visiting on specialised package tours to acquire a South Korean driver's license; the test is similar to that in China, but can be completed in less time and is easier, application and test forms are available in many languages, and a South Korean license, unlike a Chinese license, makes the holder eligible for an International Drivers License.

== Education ==
- North London Collegiate School Jeju is an independent British boarding school in Seogwipo for boys and girls from 4 to 19.
- Korean International School Jeju is an independent boarding school for boys and girls K–12.
- Branksome Hall Asia is an all-girls independent educational institution located in Seogwipo.
- St. Johnsbury Academy JeJu, a newly opened boarding and day school for boys and girls K–12 offering an American education based system, is located in Seogwipo.
- Jeju National University, a public university
- Jeju International University, a private university
- Cheju Halla University, a private college
- Jeju Tourism University, a private college
- Korea Polytechnics, a public post-secondary vocational school; the Jeju Campus is located in Jeju City.

== Health ==
In 2002, scarlet fever was reported to be in Korean children in Jeju Province. Scientists have been doing research on the matter by creating an age-period-cohort (APC) analysis to back up their relevant hypotheses regarding this emerging outbreak. The Korean National Health Insurance Service analyzed this data from the nationwide insurance claims. Their calculations of the crude incidence rate (CIR) and applying the intrinsic estimator (IE) for age and calendar groups revealed that a total of 2,345 cases of children had the fever that was one of the top illnesses. It also led to the discovery that children aged 0–2 were the most common victims of the fever and that it was mostly boys rather than girls that carried it. The CIR decreased with age between 2002 and 2016 and the age period effect decreased in all observed years. The IE coefficients validating a cohort effect went from negative to positive in 2009. To this day, no one can explain how these children in Jeju Province had scarlet fever, but results suggest that it might be explained through the cohort effect. Further descriptive epidemiological studies are needed to test children that are born after 2009, to determine whether they have the fever or not.

Studies show that Jeju Province is recorded as the region showing the highest incidence of severe fever with thrombocytopenia syndrome (SFTS) in South Korea. Just like the scarlet fever, the goal of this study was to determine the epidemiological and clinical characteristics of SFTS patients in Jeju Province. The data that was collected on this situation were obtained by the Integrated Diseases and Health Control System of the Korea Centers for Disease Control and Prevention (KCDCIS). 55 residents of Jeju were selected to test the criteria at KCDCIS and confirm the cases of SFTS with a residence listed in Jeju Province at the time of diagnosis, between 16 July 2014, and 30 November 2018. Results show that of the 55 confirmed cases of SFTS, the case fatality rate was 10.9% (95% confidence interval [CI], 4.1 to 22.2). The most common symptoms of the SFTS were severe fever, myalgia, and diarrhea. There have been fatality rates of 83.6% (95% Cl, 71.2 to 92.2), 45.5% (95% Cl, 32.0 to 59.5), and 40.0% (95% CI, 27.0 to 54.1). This particular study from 2014 to 2018, has been proven to have a lower case fatality rate and a lower incidence of severe fever, myalgia, and confusion than that of the cases nationwide of 2013–2015.

== Utilities ==
The island's power grid is connected to mainland plants by the HVDC Haenam–Cheju, and electricity is also provided by generators located on the island. As of 2001, there were four power plants on Jeju, with more under planning and construction. The most notable of these are the gas-fired generators of Jeju Thermal Power Plant, located in Jeju City. The present-day generators of this plant were constructed from 1982 onwards, replacing earlier structures that dated from 1968. As elsewhere in Korea, the power supply is overseen by the Korea Electric Power Corporation (KEPCO).

In February 2012, the governor of the state of Hawaii (US), Neil Abercrombie, and the director of the Electricity Market and Smart Grid Division at the Korea Ministry of Knowledge Economy, Choi Kyu-Chong, signed a letter of intent to share information about Smart Grid technology. The Jeju Smart Grid was initially installed in 6,000 homes in Gujwa-eup and is being expanded. South Korea is using the pilot program of the Smart Grid on Jejudo as the testing ground in order to implement a nationwide Smart Grid by 2030.

== Transportation ==
Jeju City is the principal transportation center for Jeju Province. It is home to the island's sole airport, Jeju International Airport; the Jeju-Seoul route is the world's busiest airline route.

The island is served by Jeju International Airport in Jeju City. The Seoul–Jeju City air route is by a significant margin the world's busiest, with around 13,400,000 passengers flown between the two cities in 2017. Other cities that have flights to Jeju are Daegu, Busan, Gunsan and Gwangju.

The port of Jeju is the largest on the island, serving the great majority of passenger, cargo, and fishing vessels. Jeju is also accessible from Busan by ferry. The travel time is between 3 and 12 hours.

The island has a public bus system, but there are no railways on the island. A rail tunnel to the island, linking it to the Korea Train Express network has been proposed but is currently on hold due to cost concerns and local opposition in Jeju, who are aware of an eventual loss of their indigenous traits. The Jeju Undersea Tunnel has an estimated cost of 14.6 trillion South Korean won (11.2 billion US dollars), and the proposed 73 km tunnel is projected to take 11 years to complete.

On Jeju Island, the public bus system (which is equipped with free WiFi) is organised by colours: red, green, and blue. Firstly, the red buses are express buses, which are numbered in the 100s and link up the four cardinal points of the island. They only service key points, such as transit centres and popular tourist attractions. Secondly, the blue buses are city and intercity buses, which are numbered in the 200s, 300s, and 500s. Finally, the green buses, which are known as ‘village buses’ have shorter routes across villages and towns, and travel less frequently compared to the other buses, as well as on smaller roads. These buses are numbered in the 400s, 600s, and 700s.

Additionally, there are also airport limousine buses on the island, which are large buses with a compartment for luggage that travel between the airport and Seogwipo with few stops in between.

In 2019, Jeju Special Self-Governing Province announced the launching of a service focused on public transportation mobile IOT.

== Media ==
There are five local newspapers on Jeju Island: Jeju Ilbo, Jemin Ilbo, Halla Ilbo, Seogwipo News, and Jeju Maeil. The Jeju Weekly is the only printed English-language newspaper on the island. JejuWorldWide.com is a daily online news and events Web site that opened in early 2013.

TV and radio stations include Jeju Free International City Broadcasting System (an affiliate of SBS), KBS Jeju, and Jeju MBC, and KCTV Jeju.

== Twinned regions ==
Jeju has region twinning arrangements with a variety of islands, as well as Aileu and California.

- – Hainan Province
- – Okinawa Prefecture
- – Bali Province
- – Sakhalin Oblast
- – Aileu Municipality
- – State of Hawaii
- – Autonomous Region of Madeira
- – Autonomous Region of Sardinia
- – State of California

== See also ==
- Alddreu Airfield
- Subdivisions of South Korea
- Geography of South Korea
- Jeju language (dialect)
- Jeju people
- Love Land, a sex-themed sculpture park on the island
