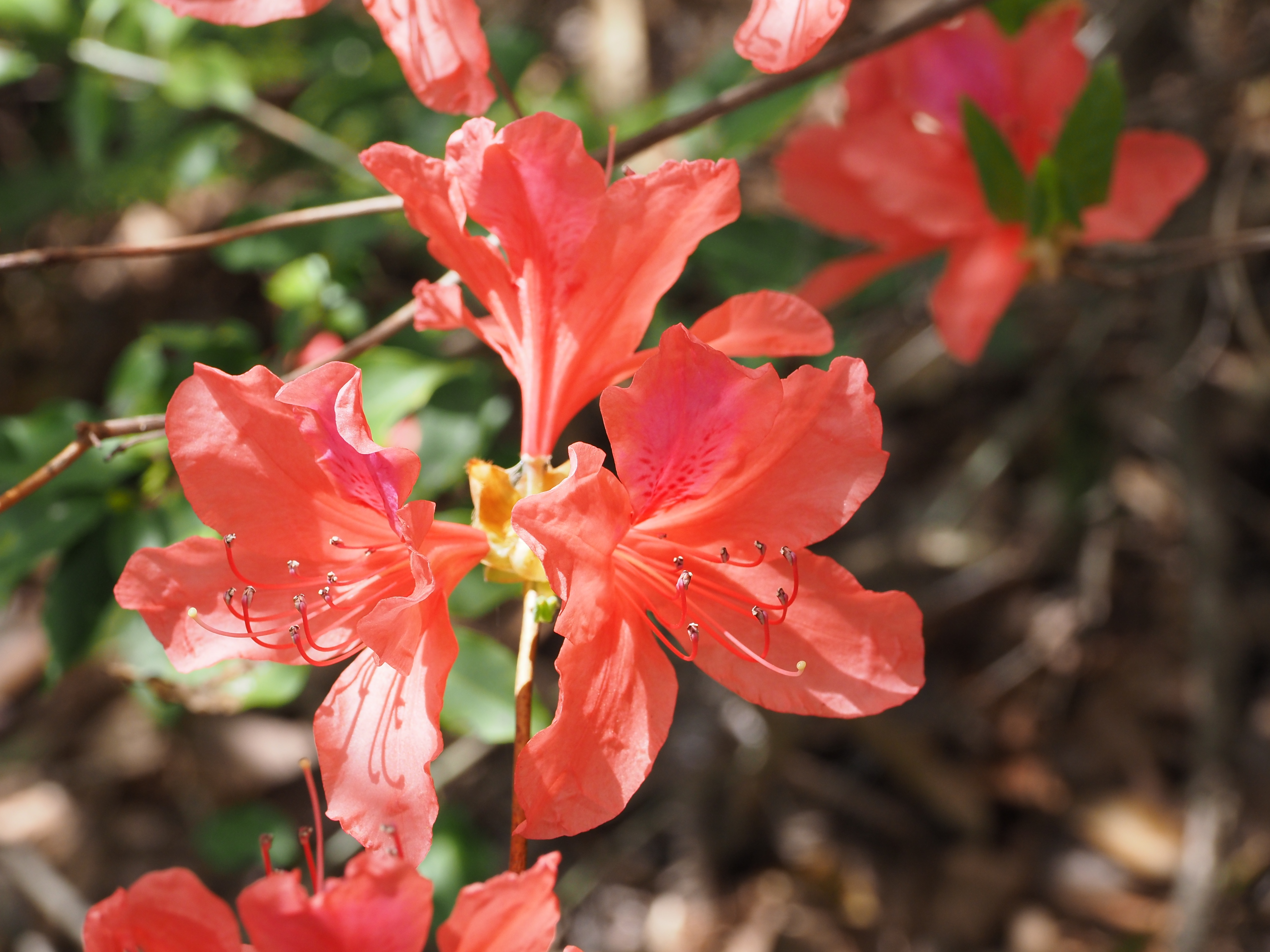
- Close-up of typical red‑orange flowers
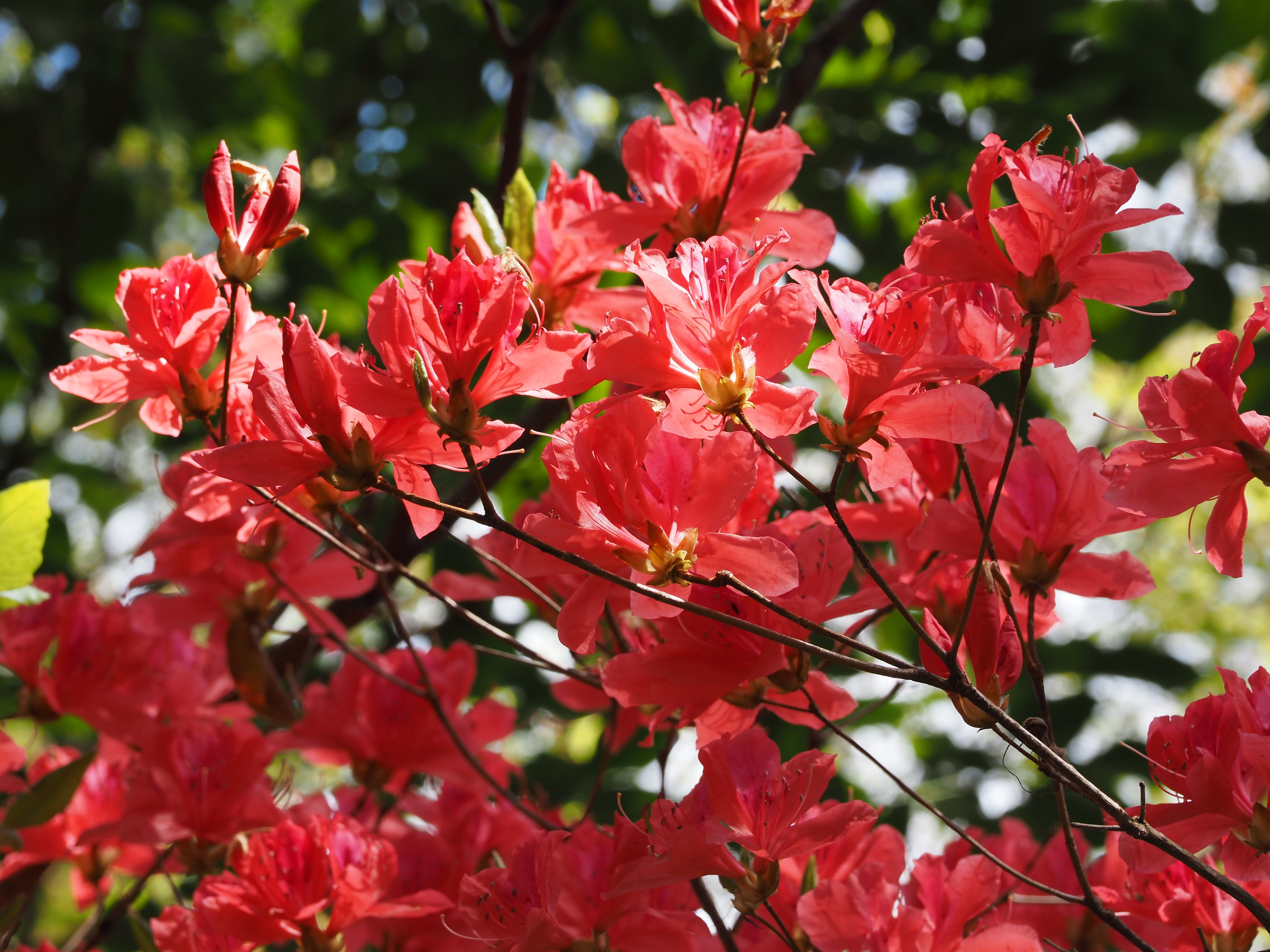
- Branch ablaze with flowers

Scientific classification
- Kingdom: Plantae
- Clade: Embryophytes
- Clade: Tracheophytes
- Clade: Angiosperms
- Clade: Eudicots
- Clade: Asterids
- Order: Ericales
- Family: Ericaceae
- Genus: Rhododendron
- Species: R. weyrichii

Binomial name
- Rhododendron weyrichii Maxim.

Synonyms
- List: Azalea weyrichii (Maxim.) Kuntze; Rhododendron farrerae var. weyrichii (Maxim.) Diels; Rhododendron shikokianum Makino; Rhododendron shikokianum var. nudistemon Koidz.; Rhododendron weyrichii f. albiflorum T.Yamaz.; Rhododendron weyrichii var. psilostylum Nakai; Rhododendron weyrichii f. purpuriflorum T.Yamaz.; Rhododendron weyrichii var. purpuriflorum (T.Yamaz.) Minamit.

= Rhododendron weyrichii =

Species of plant

Rhododendron weyrichii is a species of flowering plant in the family Ericaceae. It is native to Jeju Island, Korea, and south-central and southern Japan. A tree-like deciduous shrub reaching 3 to 15 ft (1 to 5 m), it is typically found at elevations from 20 m (70 ft) to 1,200 m (3,900 ft). It is the official flower of Jeju Province.
