= O'Sulloc Tea =

South Korean tea brand

- O'Sulloc Logo
- Predecessor: Suh Sung-hwan
- Successor: Suh Kyung-bae
- Established: 1979
- Founder: Suh Sung-hwan
- Origins: South Korea
- Region served: Asia
- Products: Tea
- Official language: Korean
- Owner: Amorepacific Corporation
- Revenue: US $49,8 millions (2021)
- Website: www.osulloc.com

O'Sulloc Tea (Korean: 오설록) is a traditional Korean tea manufactured and sold by the South Korean company O'Sulloc. The company was founded in 1979 by Suh Sung-hwan. O'Sulloc Corporation was established in September 2020 as an independent subsidiary of the Amorepacific Corporation, with 100% ownership. O'Sulloc Tea originates from the cultivated fields on Jeju Island. It is also an internationally recognized brand in other countries such as China, Japan, and the United States. O'Sulloc teas consist of a range of black and green teas based on traditional Korean tea culture. O'Sulloc teas have various certifications, and in 2010 were certified with the National Organic Program (NOP) certification by the United States Department of Agriculture (USDA).

== History ==
Suh Sung-hwan started the company in 1979 with the aim of reviving the Korean tea tradition by regenerating the ecosystems and pristine land of Jeju Island, which at the time were uninhabited and uncultivated. The initial project was based on the Dolsongi tea fields. After 1979, O'Sulloc expanded from Jeju Island to Seoul, South Korea. In 1980 O'Sulloc released the SULLOC-CHA brand, with their first green teas: Mansu, Cheonsu, and Baeksu. In 1983 new products were manufactured using green leaves harvested from Jeju Island. In 1992, a loose-leaf tea Ujeon Okro was released as well as the first tea in a can. In 1995, the Hannam tea field was developed to be managed through science and technology. In 1997, the first powder green tea was released: powder SULLOC Tea. In 1997 Suh Sung-hwan was succeeded by his son, Suh Kyung-bae.

In September 2001, the brand opened the "Tea Museum" in Seogwangdawon. In 2002 O'Sulloc tea factories became the first in the sector to be certified under Hazard analysis and critical control points (HACCP). The founder of O'Sulloc died in January 2003. In 2005, Sulloc Tea Research Institute was established near the Jeju tea fields in an effort to improve the quality of green tea. In 2010 O'Sulloc received several certifications for their organic tea from organizations such as the USDA with their NOP certification, International Federation of Organic Agriculture Movements (IFOAM) and other international and local organizations. In 2013 the Jeju O'Sulloc Tea Store was opened in Jeju as a tourism location. In 2015 O'Sulloc won an iF Design Award and opened the Tea House at the National Museum of Modern and Contemporary Art.

== Location ==
O'Sulloc tea is produced from four plantations, three of which are located on Jeju Island and one in mainland South Korea. Jeju Island has one the best environments in Korea to cultivate tea, as the soil on the island consists mainly of volcanic ash that has a better moisture retention and soil aeration compared to the soil on mainland Korea. The climate is humid subtropical giving a stable temperature all year round, with high annual precipitation.

== Tea fields ==
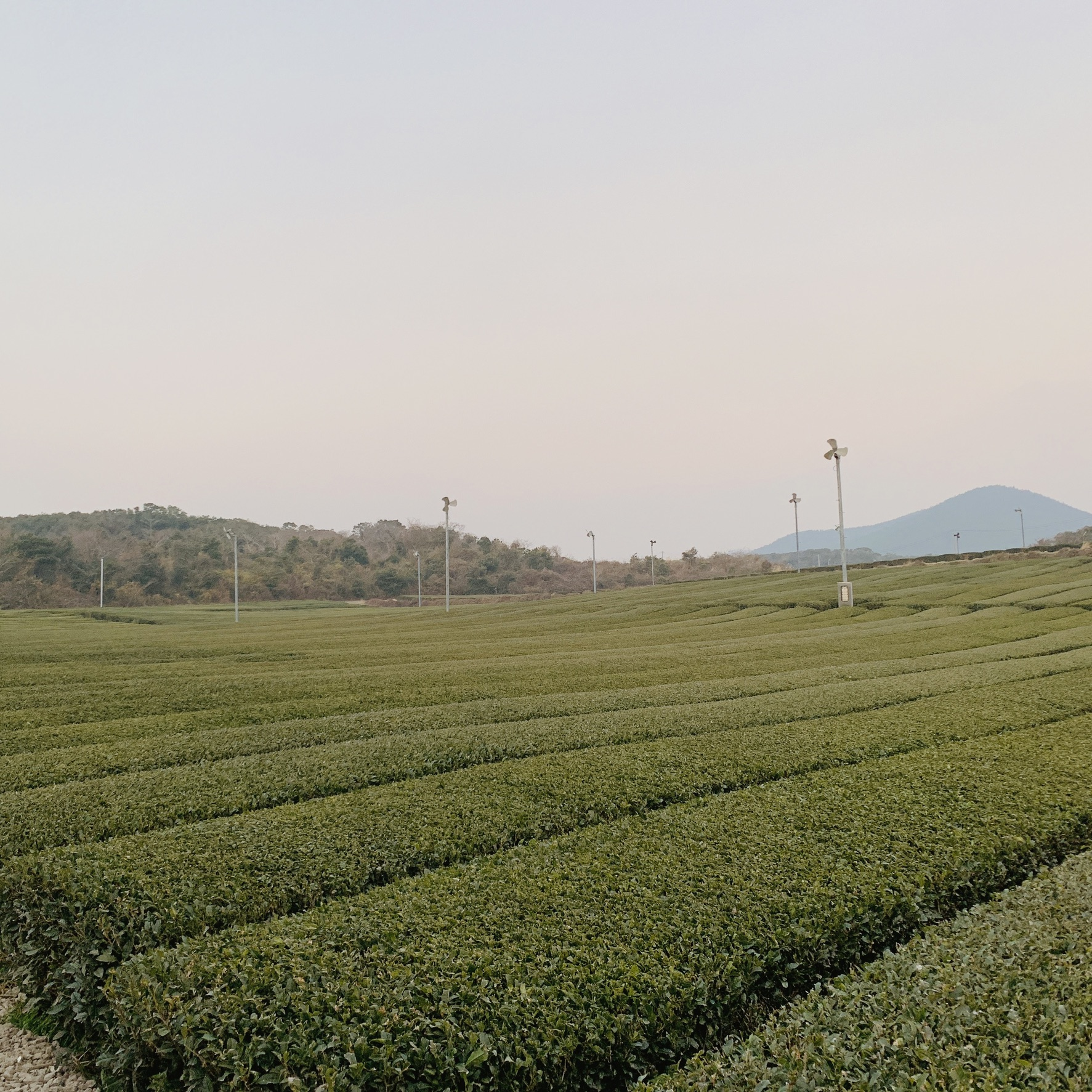
O'Sulloc tea fields

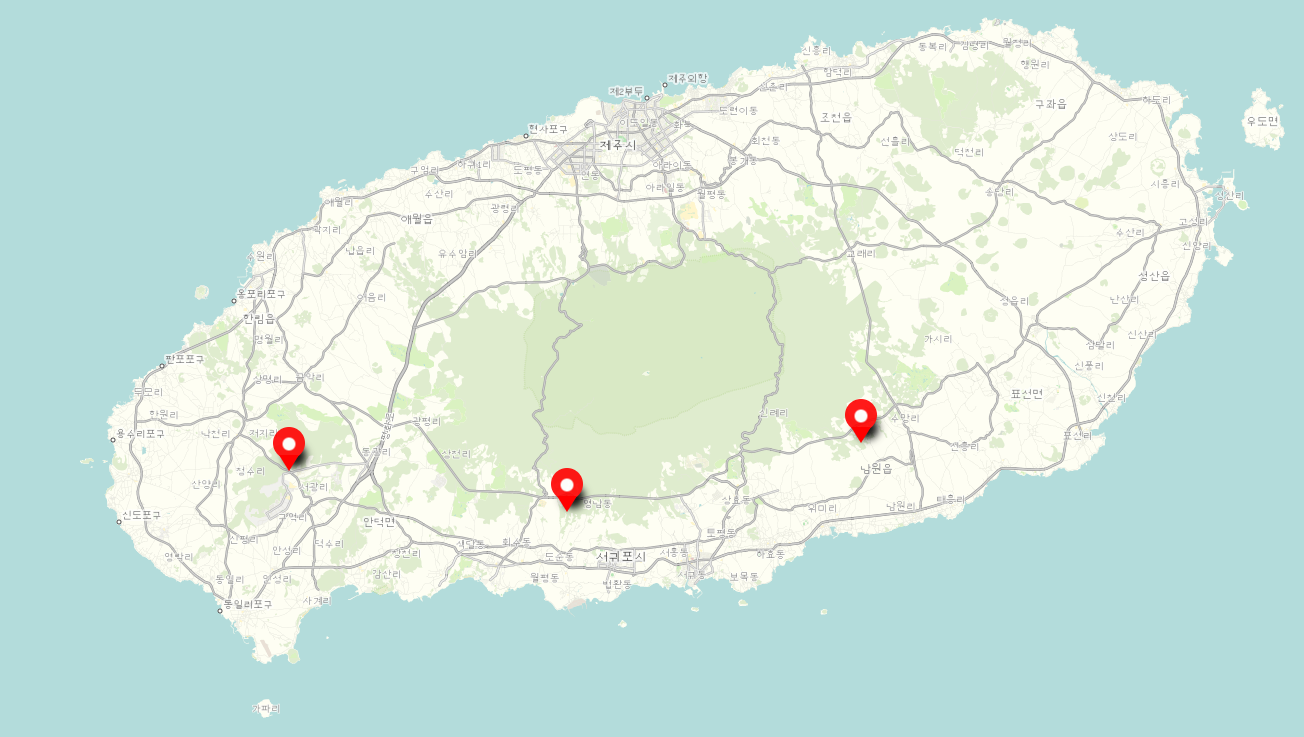
Location Of O'Sulloc Tea Fields In Jeju

Tea field's properties
Properties	Data (annual average)
Porosity	Maximum of 75%
Temperature	16 °C
Wind	4~7 m/sec
Precipitation	1800 mm

Three O'Sulloc organic tea fields, covering about 330 hectares, produce various types of teas depending on the local climate of the volcanic island. The fields have the five key elements to make teas grow productively: soil, sunlight, water, wind and mist.

Amore Pacific cultivated the Dosun tea fields on the slopes of Halla Mountain on Jeju island in 1980, and subsequently developed tea plantations on Gangjin (Jeollanam-do), Seogwang and Hannam (Jeju). The total cultivation area is approximately 330 hectares and the harvest area is approximately 180 hectares.

=== Soil Composition ===
The soil composition of Jeju Island is primarily derived from basaltic and volcanic ashes. There is a degree of silicon, aluminum, and andisols found throughout the island. O'Sulloc is located in the south-western part of the island, where non-Andisols are widely distributed though rain and water sources. The local basaltic soils have an impact on the quality of tea and provide elements such as potassium, calcium, magnesium, and sulfur. The typically desired pH level of soil for cultivating tea is between 4.0 and 5.5 pH. Jeju Island's pH levels of 4.8 to 6.5 are higher than the normal tea cultivation range, depending on the soil type, where there is a greater degree of organic matter in the high altitude brown soil.

Jeju Island's high aluminum levels can make crop maintenance difficult but the soil is suitable for tea cultivation as tea plants are able to absorb aluminum with more tolerance than other plants.

=== Cultivation Process ===
All the tea produced in Jeju by O'Sulloc is planted, sustained, collected and harvested by machine. Depending on the blend they are producing, the tea leaves are either fermented or steamed/roasted. In the fermentation process the tea leaves are injected with microorganisms that start the fermentation process, using the Bacillus subtilis strain of microorganism. The tea leaves are left to ferment for 7 days then aged inside of cedar barrels for 100 days. The steaming/roasting process is for the un-fermented tea leaves, this consist mainly of the green tea variety. The tea leaves are roasted for about 30–50 minutes in an iron roasting pan to prevent the oxidative enzymes in the leaves to start functioning. It is then left to air in the open. The process is repeated multiple times changing the temperature then the broken tea leaves are removed and the tea is dried with hot air.

=== Dolsongi tea field ===
Dolsongi was the first field to be developed by the O'Sulloc company in 1979. The land was originally covered in volcanic rocks and pebbles from the hardened volcanic ash and converted into the tea plantation, which is aerated by mountain and sea winds.

=== Seogwang tea field ===
This originally infertile and rocky land was converted by O'Sulloc in 1983 and is now the largest tea field in South Korea with an area of 52,89 hectares. It is characterized by a warm and humid climate, year round sun and natural shade. It is regarded as an example of successful agriculture production of tea in a mountain area. The Seogwang tea fields are recognized as one of the best managed tea plantations in Korea, attracting many visitors to the site.

=== Hannam tea field ===
Hannam was developed in 1995 and the tea fields extend from the summit of Hallasan Mountain to the sea of Seogwipo. The plantation has had investment for organic farming, and is characterized by a mild climate, extensive sunshine, warm breezes and young trees with a high amino acid content.

== Tea selection ==
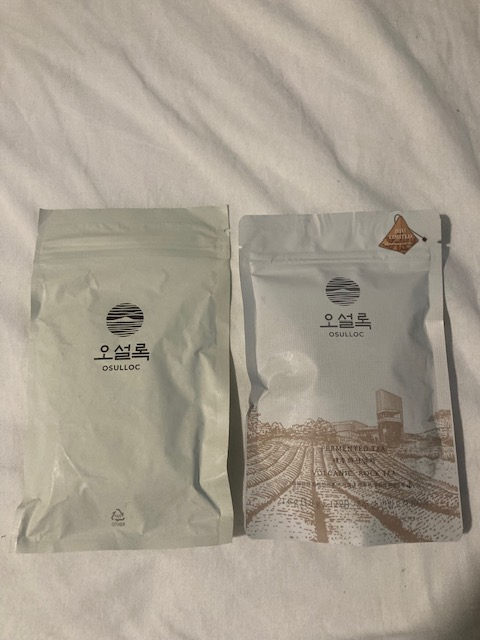
O'Sulloc tea bags

O'Sulloc Tea is produced in a range of varieties including black, rooibos, green, oolong tea, fermented tea, and blended tea. These teas are offered in tea bags or as loose tea. Some of the blended teas offered are Moonlight Island, Coral Island, and Jeju Samdayeon Tangerine Tea. O'Sulloc green teas include Sejak green tea, Wedding green tea, Omija tea, Illohyang green tea, among others. O'Sulloc offers fermented and semi-fermented teas, including Kombucha and Rooibos tea.

=== Kombucha ===
O'Sulloc released two types of Kombucha tea in 2022: Peach Camellia Kombucha and Jeju Young Tangerine Kombucha. These are differentiated by the addition of honey instead of sugar and the "Green Tea-derived Lactobacillus Scoby" developed by O'Sulloc. O'Sulloc Kombucha's Scoby uses plant lactic acid bacteria from Jeju organic green tea, domestic native yeast, and acetic acid bacteria from naturally fermented foods. It contains 20 kcal per 100 ml and is a tea with carbonation added. It also contains catechin and vitamins. Peach Camellia Kombucha has the scent of natural Camellia, and Jeju Young Tangerine Kombucha is characterized by fresh acidity and sweetness.

=== Rooibos Tea ===
O'Sulloc offers a Roobibos tea, which is derived from the plant Rooibos, or Aspalathus linearis. Unlike traditional black and green teas, Rooibos tea contains no caffeine or tannins, which is a common cause of tea bitterness. Rooibos tea has been shown in studies to cause adverse effects on the liver.

=== Omija Tea ===
Omija is a type of tea that is derived from the omija berry, that can commonly be found at 457 meters in elevation on Korean mountains. The berries are similar to goji berries, being dark red. These berries are originally from China, Korea, Japan, and Russia, but can be found across the world. The tea and berry have been used in Chinese medicine. Omija tea is often translucent red or pink in color. It has been studied for its potential health benefits as these berries contain particular lignans with anti-inflammatory, antioxidative, antiviral and sedative effects.

=== Sejak Tea ===
Sejak Tea by O'sulloc is a traditional Korean green tea by the same name, Sejak, meaning thin sparrow tongue. The tea leaves are harvested at the end of April as part of the second harvesting.

== O'Sulloc Tea Museum ==
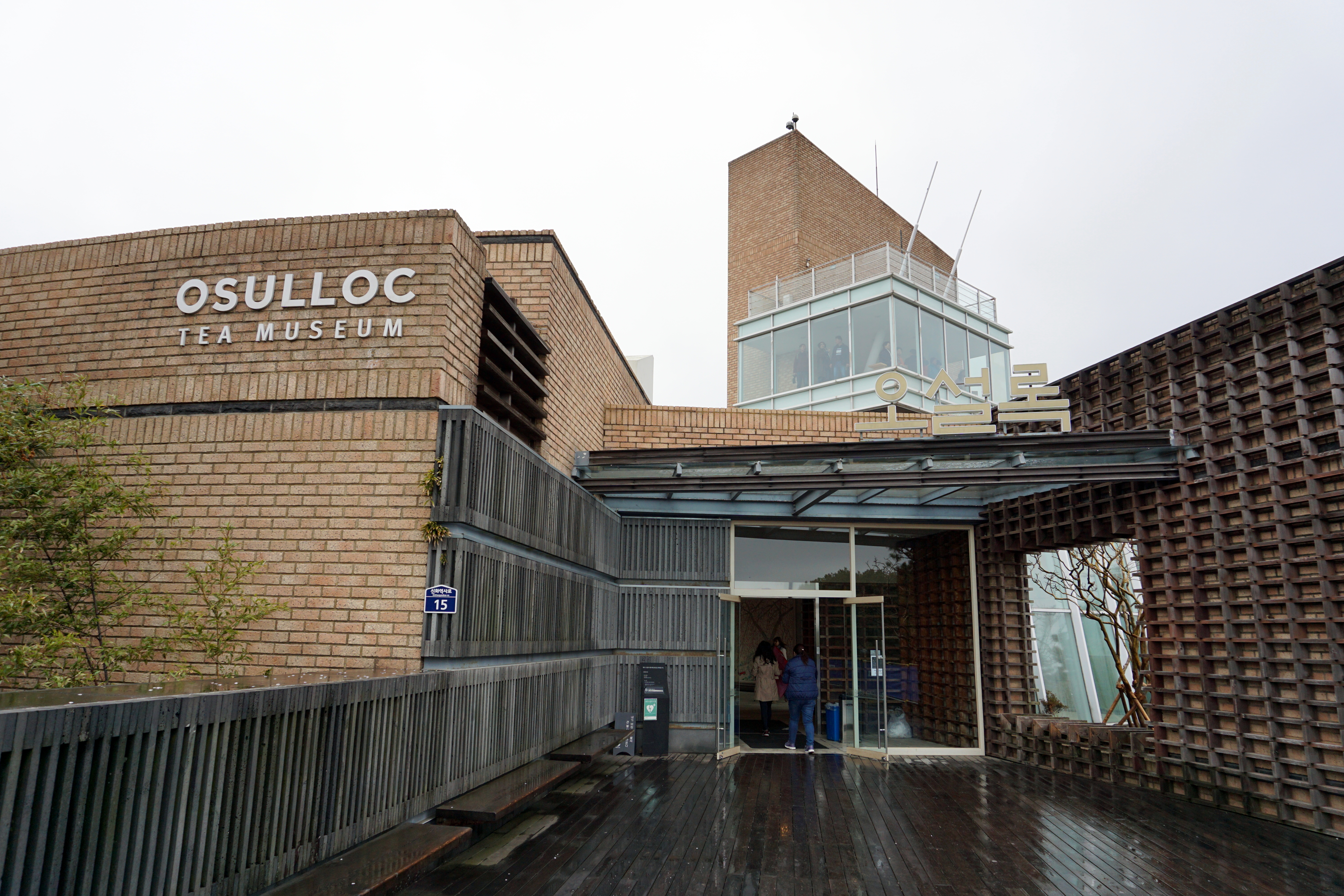
O'Sulloc tea museum

The O'Sulloc Tea Museum is located at the Seogwipo tea plantation on Jeju island. It was opened by Amorepacific Corporation in September 2001 and was the first tea Museum opened in South Korea. The museum is aimed at introducing and spreading Korean tea history and tradition. It is a popular tourist location, visited by 1.5 million people annually. On Jeju Island it is ranked as the 7th most visited attraction by locals and the 10th by visitors. It has been rated as one of the top 10 museums in the world for internal design and external setting. In 2020, the museum expanded with three new buildings, including cafes and an exhibition space. Visitors can also view the roasting of tea leaves harvested from the neighboring plantation. The O'Sulloc Tea Museum was used as an example of a study on brand communication space based on experiential exhibition in 2015.

=== The Tea Stone ===
The Tea Stone building was opened in March 2003 and consists of two floors of exhibition space, including Chusa Kim Jung-hee's Sehando and Chusa body-themed media art and an experience space for O'Sulloc's signature fermented tea "Sam Da-yeon". The Tea Stone also provides classes on the specific interpretation of Korean Tea Culture, including the use of traditional Korean tea utensils such as the inkstone and inkstick, which has spiritual significance to the culture.

=== Innisfree Jeju House ===
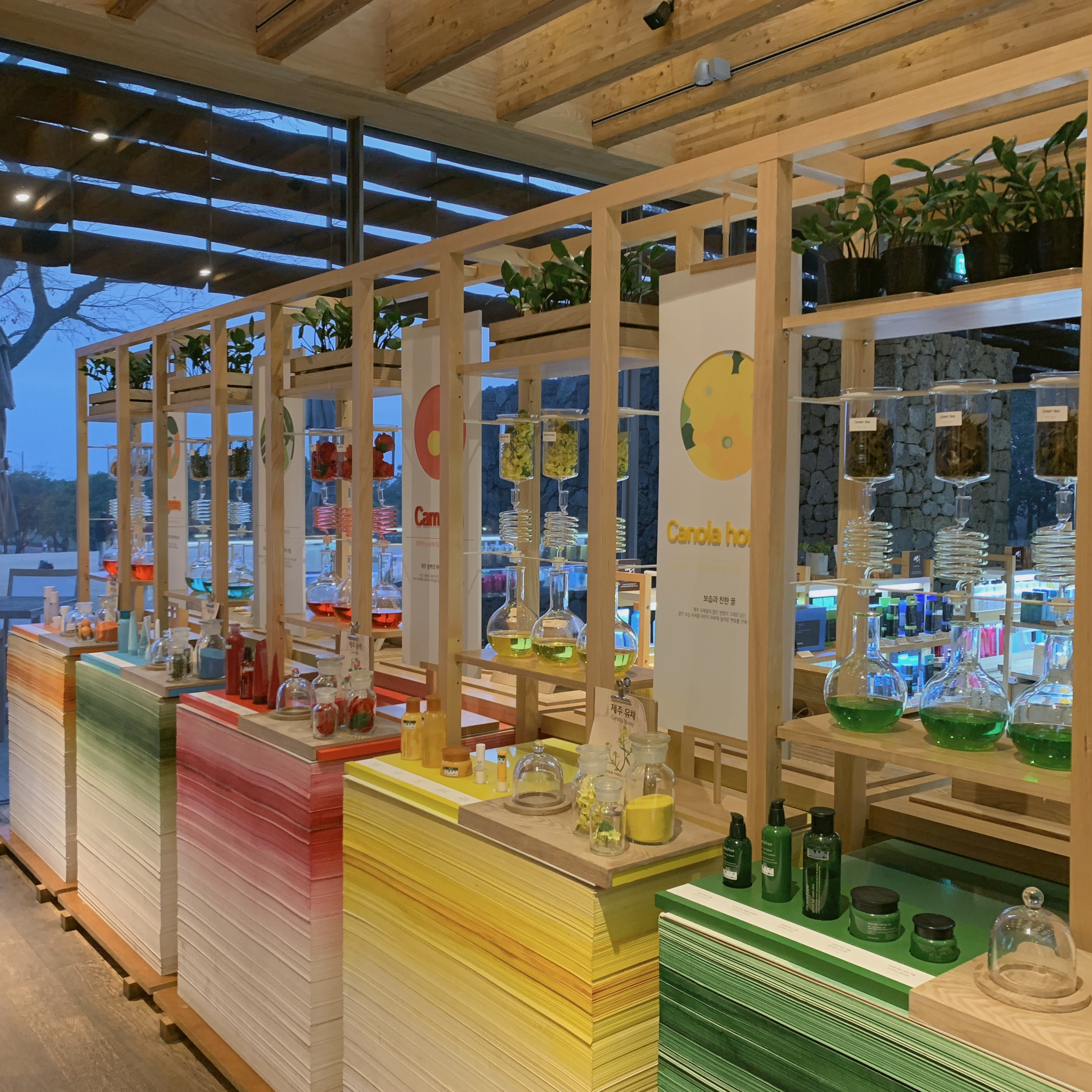
Innisfree Jeju House

The Innisfree Jeju House opened in March 2013 and was created by the Innisfree cosmetics brand as an experience center based on the slogan "a space that becomes one with nature". It promotes products made of Jeju natural materials through five experience zones based on the five senses. These include: a Cosmetics Experience Zone (cosmetics made of Jeju ingredients); a Jeju Story Zone (scent of Jeju); a Natural Soap Class Zone (natural soap using Jeju's green tea, tangerines, and volcanic pine powder); the Organic Green Cafe (food and drinks made with fresh ingredients from Jeju); and the Green Garden, an outdoor area (where visitors can experience the natural environment such as organic green tea fields, Gotjawal, and lakes).

== O'Sulloc Tea Houses ==
O'Sulloc currently has six tea house locations in South Korea. All of the tea houses are located in Seoul. The first one was opened in Myeongdong, Seoul in 2004, but it does not exist now. The oldest tea house is currently in The National Museum of Contemporary Art, opened in 2013.

=== O'Sulloc Bukchon Tea House ===
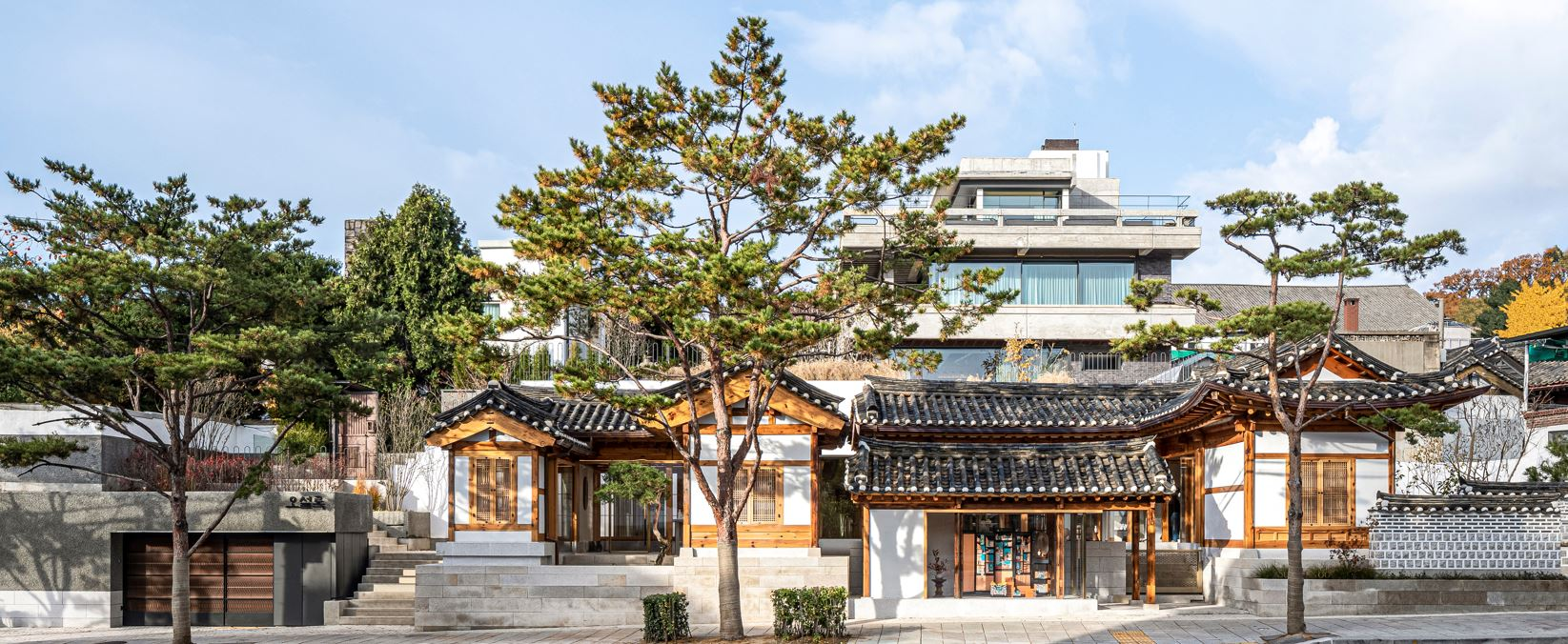
O'Sulloc Bukchon Tea House

The O'Sulloc Bukchon Tea House was opened in Seoul in November 2021. A three-story building recreates the ambience of a 1970s domestic house, with a view of Hanok Village. It provides facilitated tea tasting and tea blending classes with various herbs.

== O'Sulloc worldwide ==
O'Sulloc obtained the NOP certification from the USDA, and the EU-organic production-regulation certification by the EU to expand its business area overseas.

=== Awards ===
O'Sulloc's Ilohyang tea received the World Tea Prize at the China Tea Fair in 1999. Ilohyang also won the Gold Prize at the Japan World Green Tea Contest in 2011 and 2014. Ilohyang ranked first in the "North American Tea Championship" four times in 2009, 2011, 2012 and 2014.

O'Sulloc's Masters green tea line Woojeon won the first place in the mixed tea category at the 2016 North American Tea Championship. Woojeon tea is made of soft tea leaves in spring, and is characterized by a mild, sweet, and savory flavor.

== Controversy ==
=== Trademark dispute ===
Ogada, a South Korean herbal tea company, tried to launch new products such as South Korean style Yuja syrup and traditional tea bags as well as herbal tea to expand its business area from domestic to overseas. In the process, Ogada realized that Amorepacific corporation had applied to the South Korean Intellectual Property Office for dozens of trademarks called Ogada, and filed an objection with the court in 2013. In 2014, the court sided with Ogada, while Amorepacific corporation only registered the trademark in advance and had no actual corporate activities, Ogada won based on the court's judgment that the trademark's authority was for Ogada, a latecomer, because it gained recognition from consumers through brand production activities.

== Research studies on O'Sulloc tea ==
Three commercial blended O'Sulloc tea samples were tested in a 2018 study by researchers at Sunchon National University and Pusan National University (South Korea) to develop a lexicon to describe the sensory flavor and aroma characteristics of fermented and blended teas, including Samdayeon Jeju tangerine (O'Sulloc, Jeju, South Korea), and Red papaya black tea (O'Sulloc).

Some green tea leaves of the Camellia sinensis species collected from the O'Sulloc Tea Garden in Jeju were used in a 2015 study by researchers at The Catholic University of Korea and Amore Pacific (South Korea) to study and isolate the main polyphenols contained in the green tea leaves.

A study was conducted in 2020 by researchers at Chung-Ang University and Amore Pacific (South Korea) on the Antibacterial and Antifungal activity of the Lactiplantibacillus plantarum bacteria that was isolated from green tea collected in the O'Sulloc tea fields in Jeju.

Camellia sinensis obtained in the O'Sulloc tea fields in Jeju were used in a 2019 study conducted by researchers at Chiba University (Japan) in a study regarding the attenuation of cognitive impairment in PS2 and Tg2576 mice.

In a study comparing the characteristics of post-fermented tea in Korea, China, and Japan in 2021, Professor Lee Sang-Gyo of Graduate School of Mokpo National University classified O'Sulloc's Samdayeon and Dalbitgeotki as one of Korea's post-fermented tea.

== See also ==
- Green Tea
- Korean cuisine
- Jeju Island
- Tea plantation
