= Samseong mythology =

Mythology of Jeju, South Korea

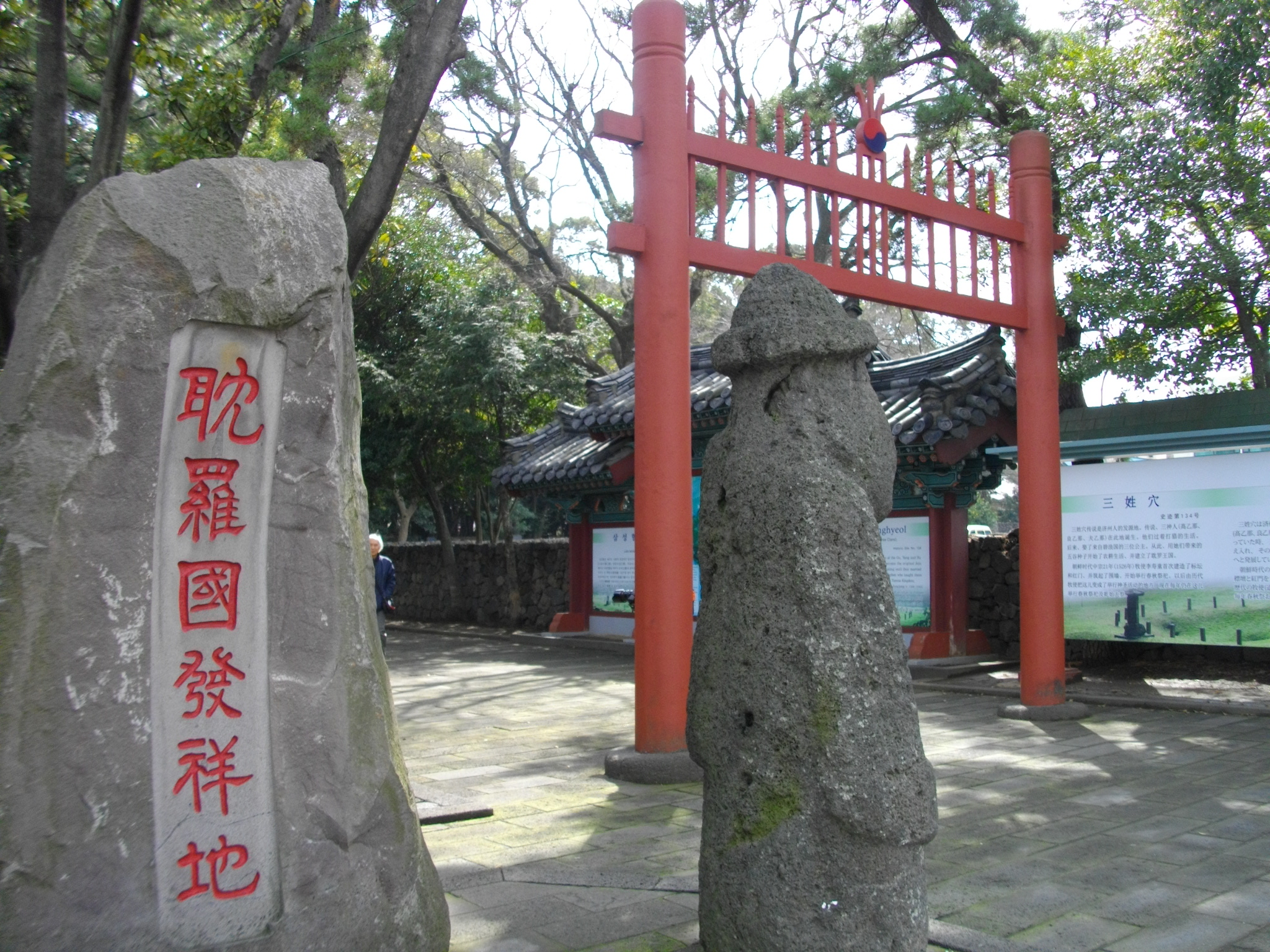
Entrance to Samseonghyeol

Samseong mythology (Korean: 삼성신화; Hanja: 三姓神話) originates in the Tamna kingdom, present-day Jeju Island, South Korea. It is distinct from the Dangun mythology of the Korean Peninsula. It is described in the local historical documents Yeong Ju Ji (영주지; 瀛州誌) and Tamnaraji (탐라지; 耽羅志) as well as the Joseon-era account Goryeosa.

== Excerpt ==
The following is an excerpt from Goryeosa, volume 57, describing an aspect of Samseong mythology:

初無人、三神人從地聳出其主山北麓有穴曰毛興、是其地也.長曰良乙那、次曰高乙那、三曰夫乙那、三人遊獵荒僻、皮衣肉食.一日、見紫泥封蔵木函、浮至東海濱、就而開之、函內又有石函.有一紅帶紫衣使者、隨來開函、有靑衣處女三人及諸駒犢五穀種、乃曰: 「我是日本國使也、吾王生此三女、云西海中嶽降神子三人、將欲開國而無配匹、於是命臣侍三女而來、宜作配以成大業.」使者忽乘雲而去、三人以年次分娶之.就泉甘土肥處射矢卜地、良乙那所居曰第一都、高乙那所居曰第二都、夫乙那所居曰第三都、始播五穀且牧駒犢、日就富庶.十五代孫高厚、高淸、高季昆弟三人、造船渡海、泊于耽津、蓋新羅盛時也.于時客星見南方、太史奏曰: 「異國人來朝之象也.」及厚等至、王嘉之、稱厚曰星主、以其動星象也.令淸出袴下、愛如己子、稱曰王子.又稱其季曰都內.邑號曰耽羅、以初來泊耽津而朝新羅也.各賜寶蓋・衣帶而遣之、自此子孫蕃盛、敬事新羅.以高爲星主、良爲王子、夫爲徒上.其後服事百濟、除星主・王子之號、以其爲佐平使者、爲恩率.及羅濟亡、耽羅國主見太子未老、朝高麗太祖、因賜星主・王子爵瑞山.

Ancient Jeju Island was called Ying Prefecture, and nobody lived there. Three gods—Ryang eul na (량을나; 良乙那), Go eul na (고을나; 高乙那), and Bu eul na (부을나; 夫乙那)—appeared at Samseonghyeol (삼성혈; 三姓穴), at the southern foot of Tamna mountain (탄나산; 漢拏山). They were the ancestors of the inhabitants of Jeju Island. One day, they were looking at Tamna mountain and discovered a box that came from the East Sea. Within the box, they found three beautiful princesses, farm animals, and five grain seeds, originating in Japan. The gods took the princesses as their wives, planted the seeds, and began farming, thus founding a village.

== See also ==
- Korean mythology
