= Jeju Stone Park =

Stone museum and park in Jeju City, South Korea

- 제주돌문화공원
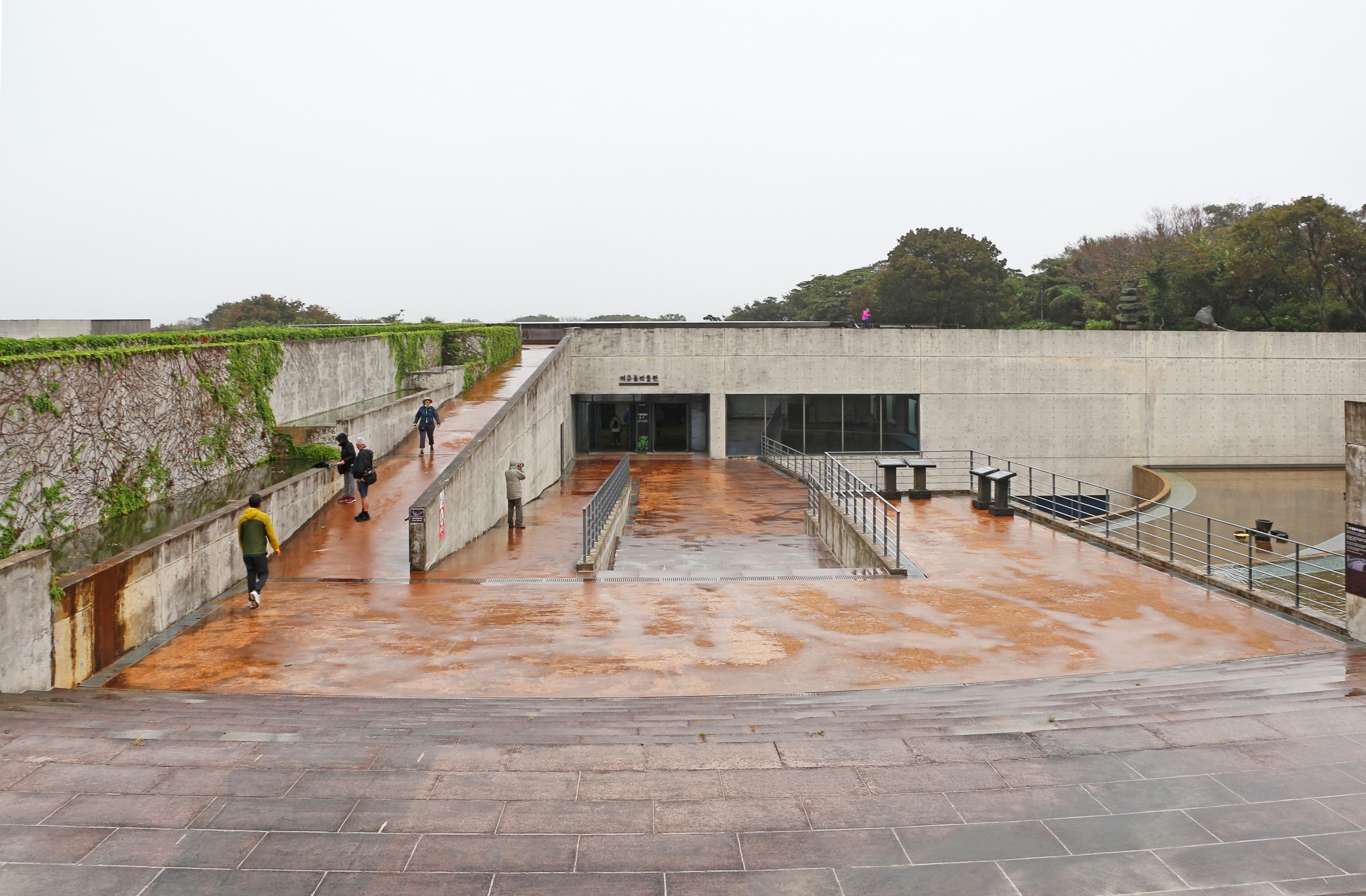
- Jeju Stone Museum, one part of the park (2022)
- Established: June 3, 2006
- Location: Jocheon, Jeju City, Jeju Province, South Korea
- Coordinates: 33.448°N 126.658°E
- Type: Cultural museum, park
- Founder: Paek Un-chol
- Website: jeju.go.kr/jejustonepark/index.htm (in Korean)

Jeju Stone Park (Korean: 제주돌문화공원; lit. 'Jeju Stone Culture Park') is a museum and park that focuses on how stone has culturally been used in Jeju Province, South Korea. It is located in Jocheon, Jeju City, and first opened to the public on June 3, 2006. It was continually constructed until it was completed in February 2021.

== Description ==
The park spans 327 ha (810 acres). It consists of the Jeju Stone Museum, a garden themed around Jeju's mythology, an outdoor Jeju Stone Cultural Exhibition Hall, a traditional Jeju folk village, and 500 stone piles symbolizing generals of Jeju legend.

In July 1998, the founding director of the park, Paek Un-chol, submitted a proposal for the park to the local government. On January 19, 1999, he received approval to start the park. A 2017 article reported that he spent 40 years creating and collecting stone sculptures. He had previously run a park from 1971 to 2009 called the Tamla Mok Seok Won, which featured unusual root and stone formations. That park's popularity peaked in the 1970s and 1980s, before dwindling as South Koreans began traveling abroad in the 1990s. Beginning in 2000, he moved much of that park's collection to the Jeju Stone Park. Groundbreaking work began on the park on September 19, 2001.

The park aims to cover Jeju's culture, history, and mythology. It covers Seolmundae Halmang, a grandmother deity of the island. It has also covered Jeju shamanism, for example in an exhibit about the South Korean artist Nam June Paik. It has also hosted events, such as the annual Seolmundae Halmang Festival, which has been held in May since 2007.

The park has also hosted academic conferences and other events. In 2024, it was announced that the park would host an upcoming UNESCO training and research center.

== Gallery ==
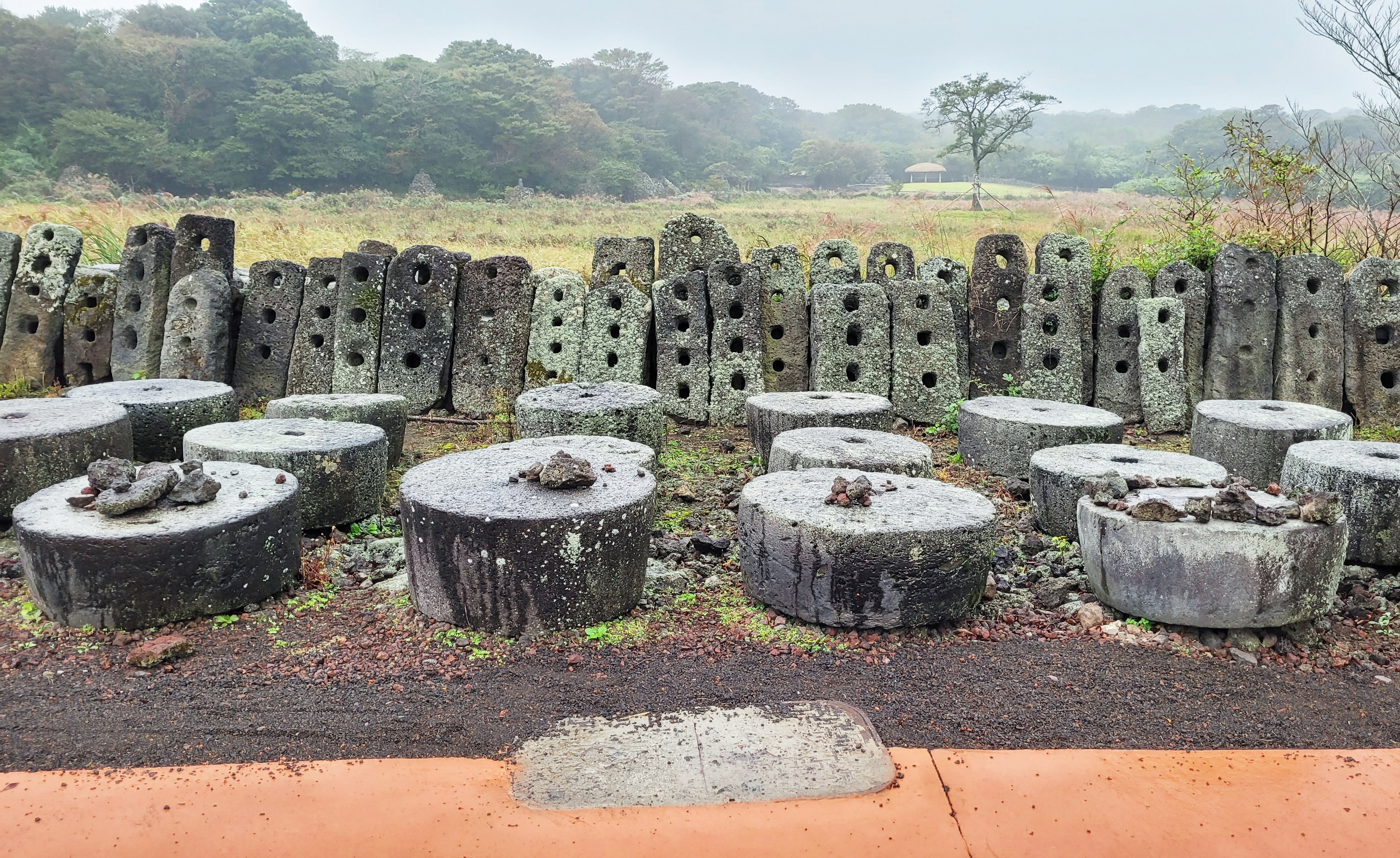
Stones in the park (2022)

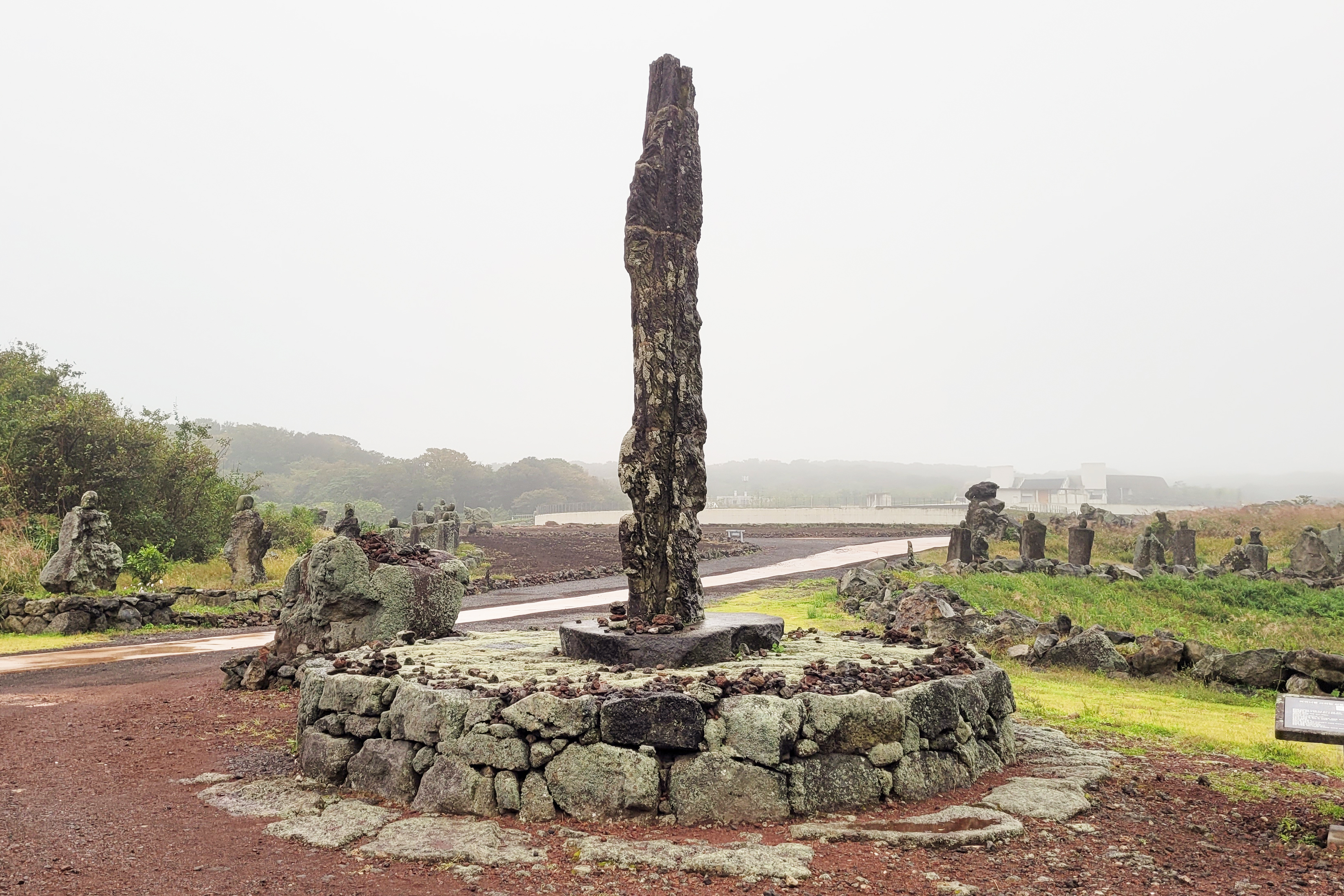
Stones in the park (2022)

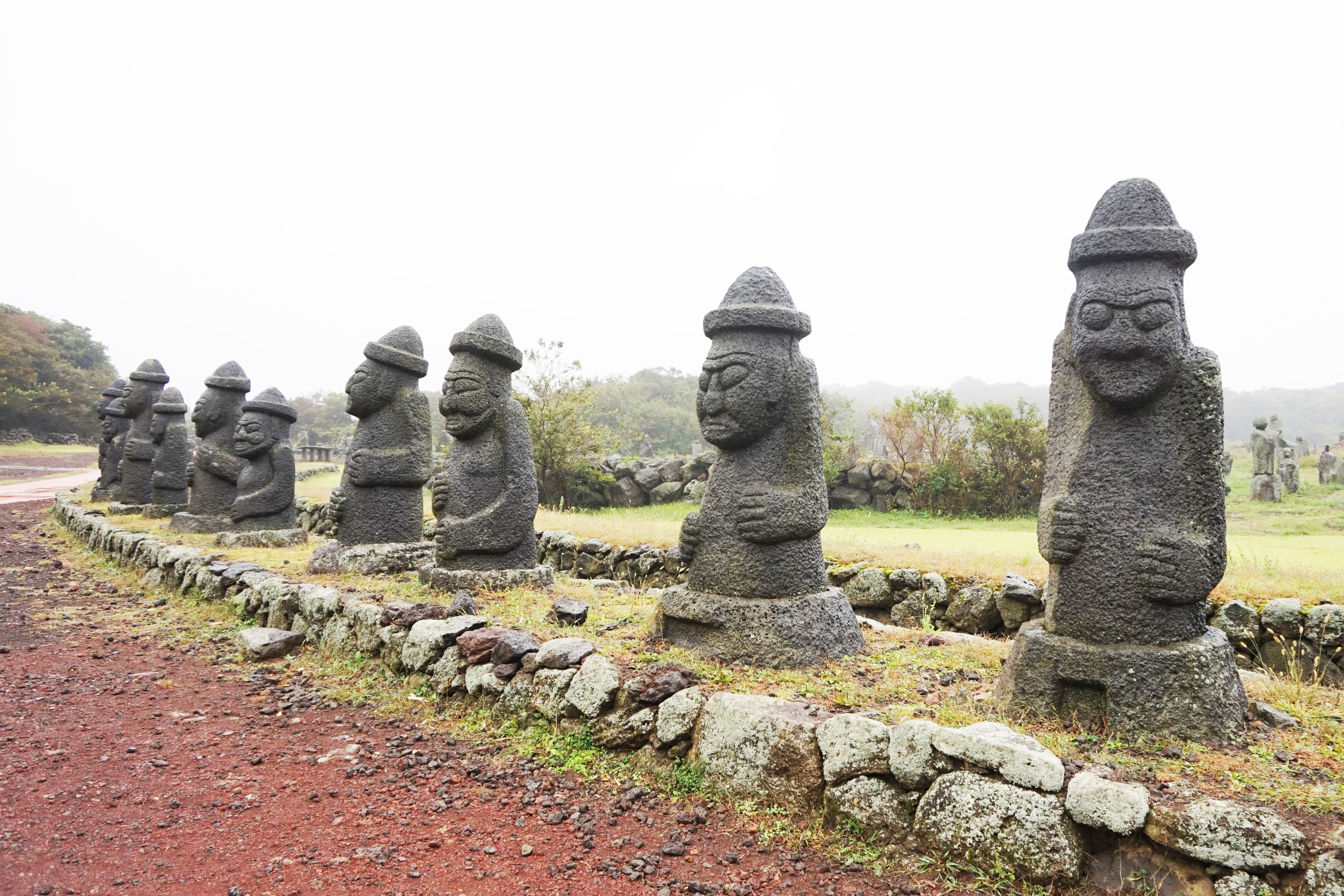
Dol hareubang statues in the park (2022)

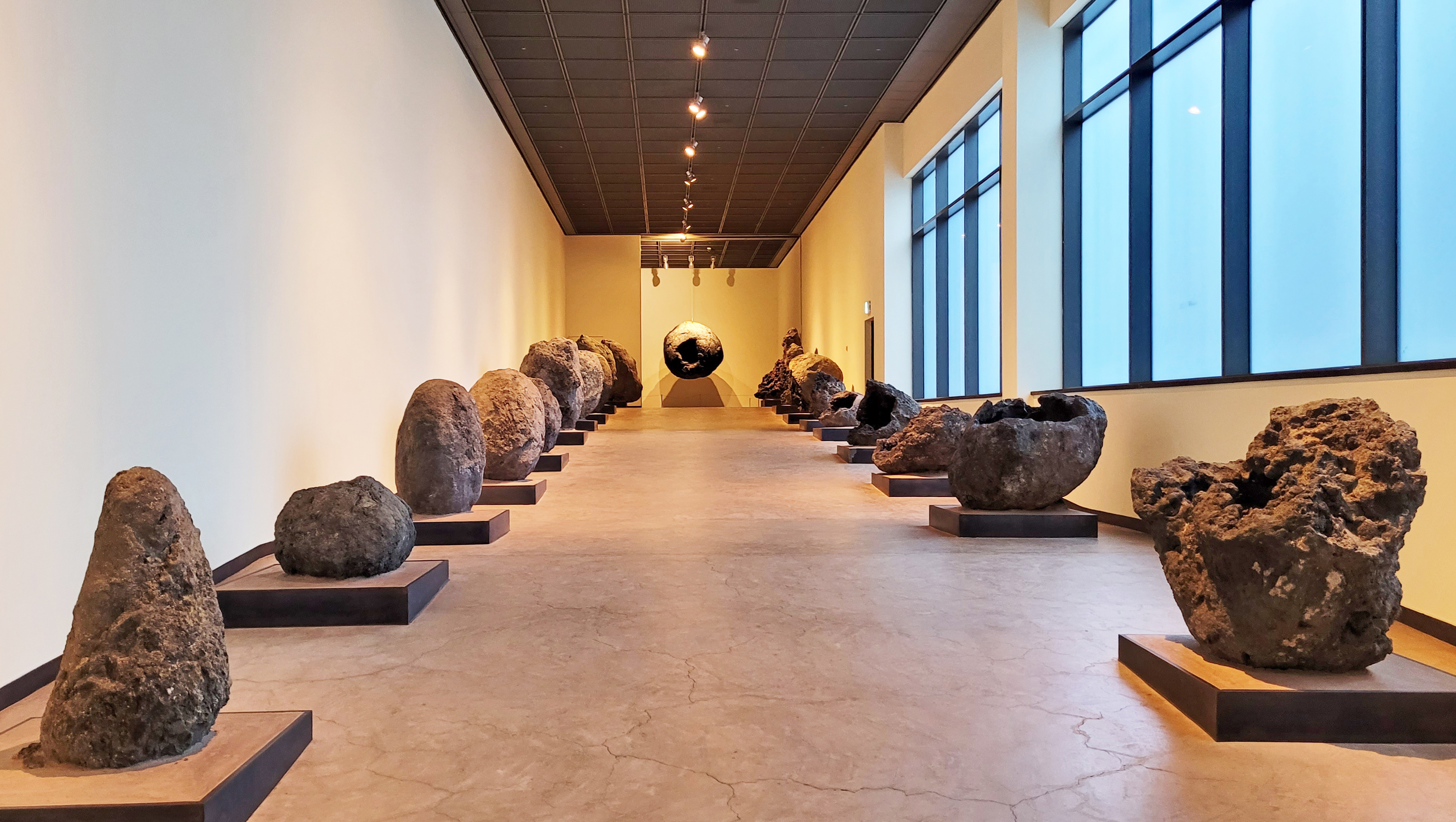
Stones in the Jeju Stone Museum (2022)

== See also ==
- Doldam – cultural practice of piling volcanic stones in Jeju Province
- Seongeup Folk Village – a folk village in Seogwipo
