= Doldam =

Stone structures on Jeju Island, Korea

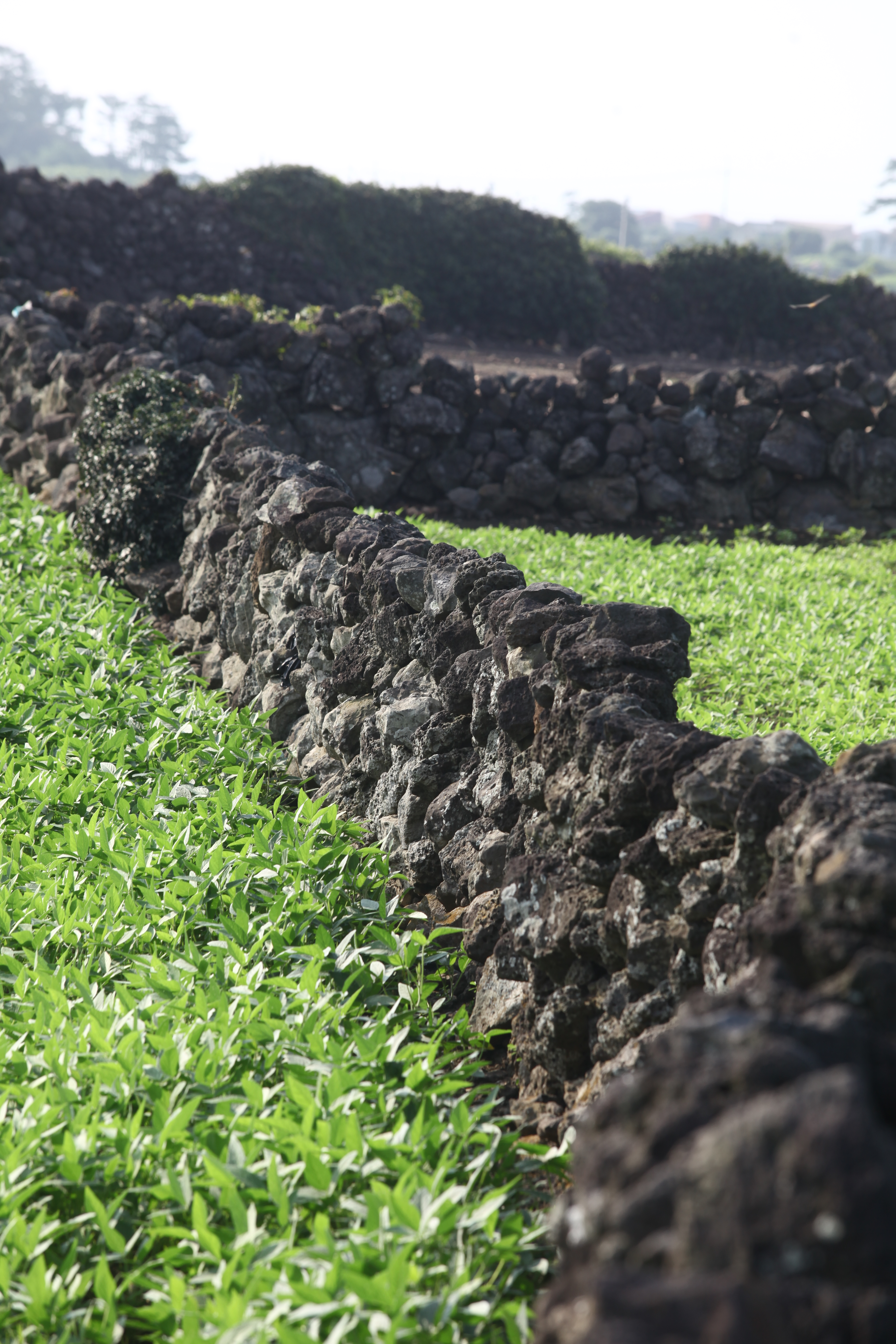
Doldam walls around fields, called batdam (2014)

Doldam (Jeju: 돌담) refers to traditional cultural practices surrounding the use of piled volcanic stones on Jeju Island, Korea. Doldam structures have been present on Jeju Island for many centuries and are considered quintessential symbols of Jeju's culture and aesthetic.

Doldam is applied in a wide variety of situations, and the names for various structures differ based on their application and techniques applied in their creation.

== Description ==
The volcanic Jeju Island has ubiquitous black basalt stones throughout the island, including in its mountains, waters, and fields. Jeju Island is reputed for such rocks; it is nicknamed "Samdado" (삼다도), meaning "island of the 'three haves'". These three 'haves' are wind, women, and stones.

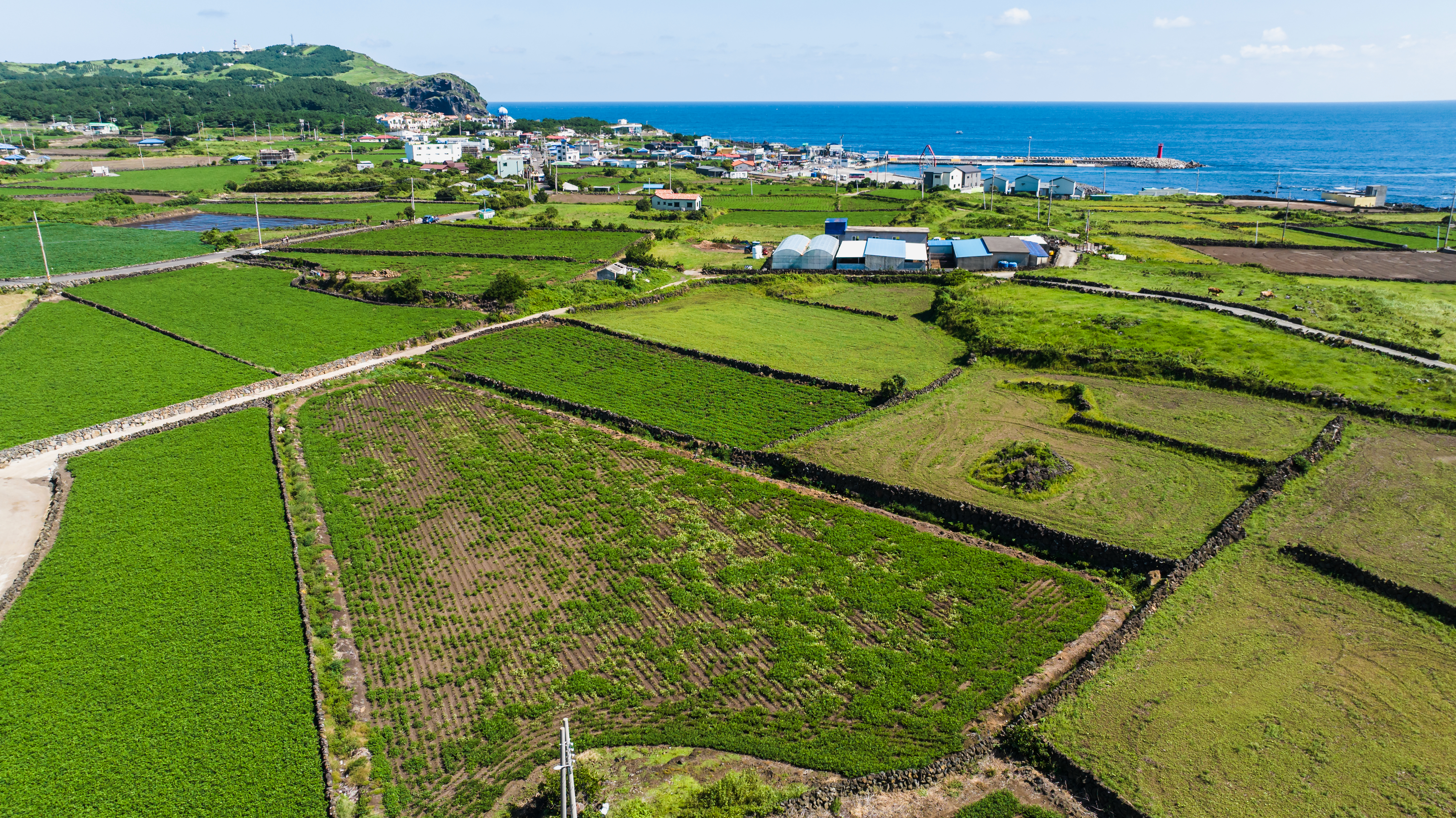
Batdam on the island Udo (2023)

Farmers who try to prepare a field reportedly inevitably find numerous stones just below the surface level of dirt, and thus it is considered a common sight in the island for there to be large piles of volcanic rock next to fields. These rocks are often used in creating walls around fields; such walls are so ubiquitous around the island, that the island is nicknamed Heungnyongmalli (흑룡만리; 黑龍萬里; lit. 'ten thousand li black dragon'), in reference to the appearance of the walls being long and winding. One of the reasons that the walls are not straight is because they incorporate large stones that farmers could not remove from the fields.

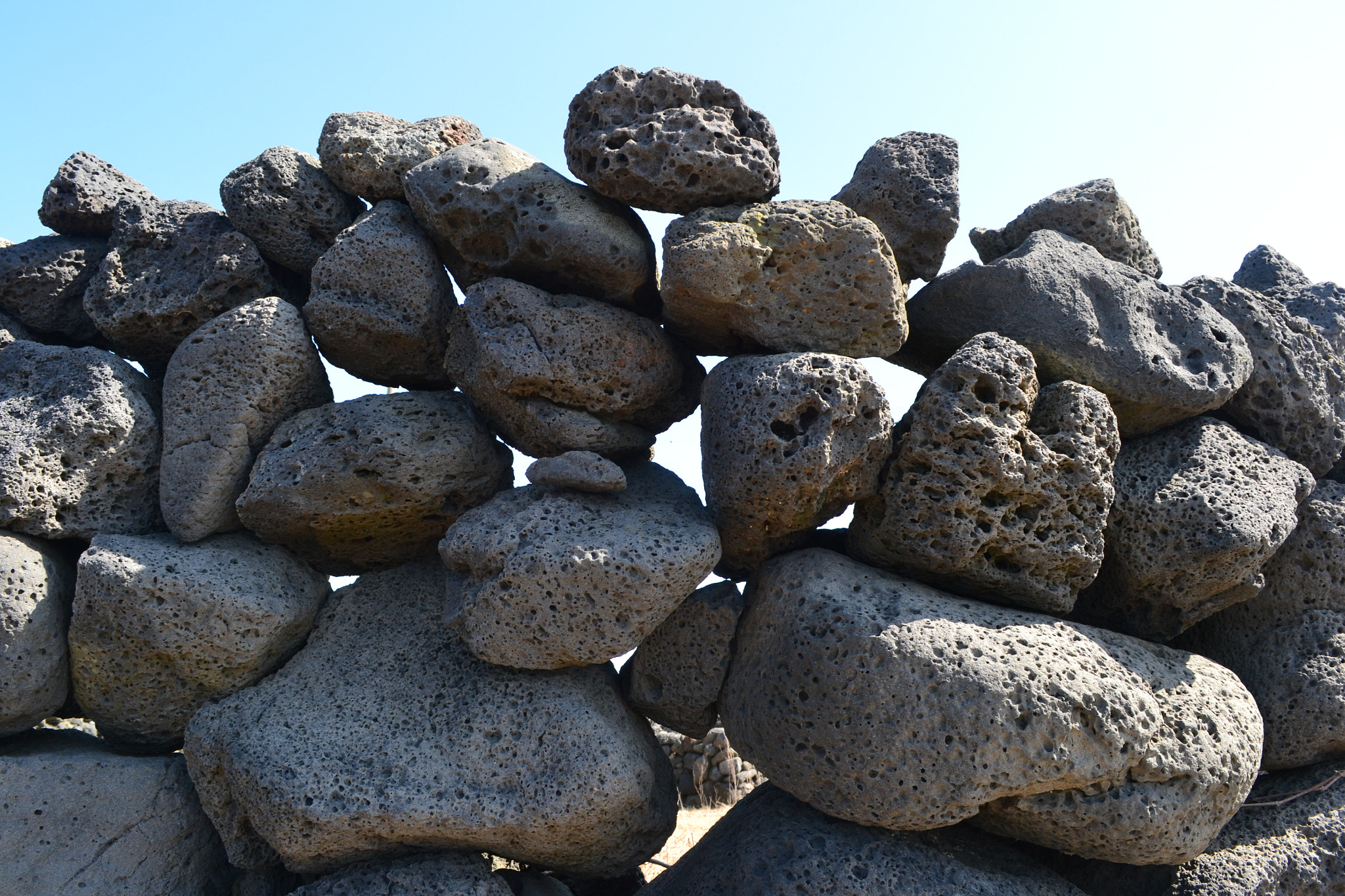
Holes visible in a doldam wall (2016)

Stones are traditionally piled without adhesives; it is considered a skill to be able to create structures using gravity and the angular shapes of the rocks that can resist Jeju's typhoon winds. Some structures deliberately have visible holes in them; they are built this way to accommodate some wind passing through in order to avoid the structure toppling, while acting as a wind-break. In recent years, some walls have used cement to fill the gaps. This phenomenon has prompted some negative reactions, with some describing the walls as less resilient to wind and ignoring generations-old cultural wisdom.

Piled stone structures can be found throughout Jeju and are used in a wide variety of applications, including demarcating boundaries, rituals, buildings, building walls, catching fish, and reducing the impact of wind and salt. A number of Jeju's fortresses have piled stone walls that were used for defense.

=== Names and structure types ===
Piled stone structures were called by different names depending on their application. Ritual stone piles called bangsatap can be found throughout Jeju, and shrines are often surrounded by piled stone barriers. Piled stone structures used for building houses are called chukdam (축담). Piled stones for demarcating boundaries are called ujatdam (우잣담), ureotdam (우럿담), or uldam (울담). The action of building a piled stone wall around a house is called uldam dureuda (울담 두르다). Stone walls used to demarcate fields are called batdam (밭담). A 2023 news article claimed there is one estimate that there are around 22,100 km (13,700 mi) of batdam on the island.

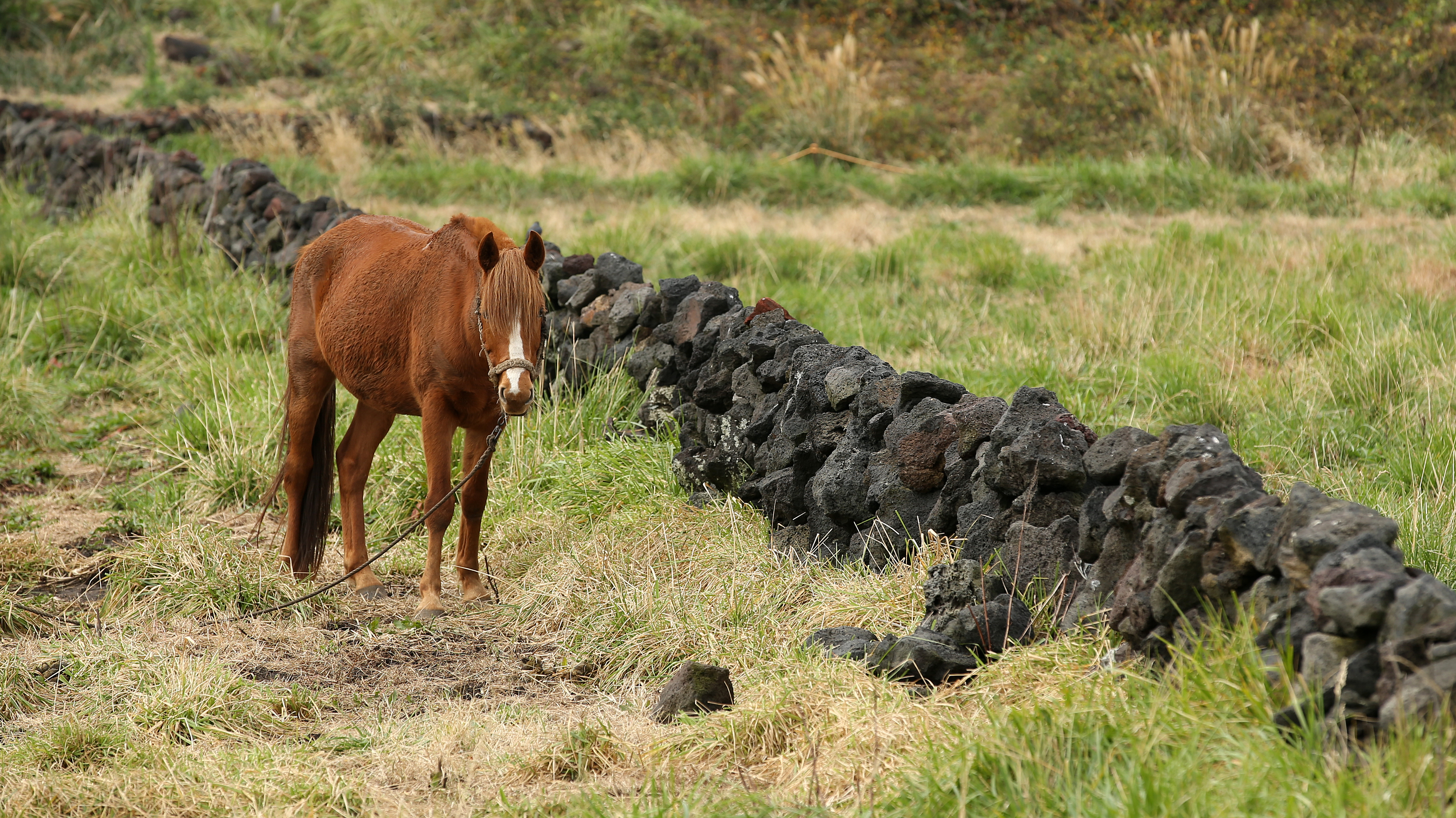
A Jeju horse next to a doldam wall (2014)

Piled stones around graves, which were often arranged in circles or squares, are called sandam (산담). Walls made of small stones are called jatbaek (잣벡), jatbaekdam (잣벡담), or jatdam (잣담). Piled stone structures called wondam (원담) were also used in the water for trapping fish during low tide. Depending on what kind of fish was being captured, the wondam could be called by other names, including sungeowon (숭어원; for catching sungeo) or melwon (멜원; for catching mel; 멜; 멸치). Doldam walls are also used for olle, which are walled entrance paths to houses. Such walls were also used as barriers to keep and manage livestock.

A number of names for piled stone walls exist, that differ depending on how the wall was built. Walls with multiple layers on the bottom and a single layer on top are called baekketdam (백켓담). Walls composed of a single layer are called oedam (외담); these walls typically deliberately have large holes. Walls composed of two layers with rubble in between them are called jeopdam (접담; 겹담).

== History ==
It is unclear when doldam structures first began to be used. There is a 1234 record of piled stone structures being used on Jeju to demarcate property.

Doldam barriers were used to protect the coastline from foreign invaders such as wokou (waegu in Korean; Japanese pirates); some of these structures still remain. The use of piled stone walls for defense continued even into the 20th century; they were employed during the Jeju uprising.

While modern building techniques have resulted in some decline in the usage of these stone structures, there are conscious efforts to maintain and preserve them as part of the island's aesthetic and culture. There is reportedly an association (제주돌담보전회) dedicated to the preservation and restoration of doldam structures on the island.

== Culture ==
Doldam has been featured in works of fiction and art about Jeju. There is a Batdam Theme Park in Woljeong-ri. The structures have been described as having the feeling of being ancient and in harmony with nature, giving the island a traditional appeal.

== Gallery ==
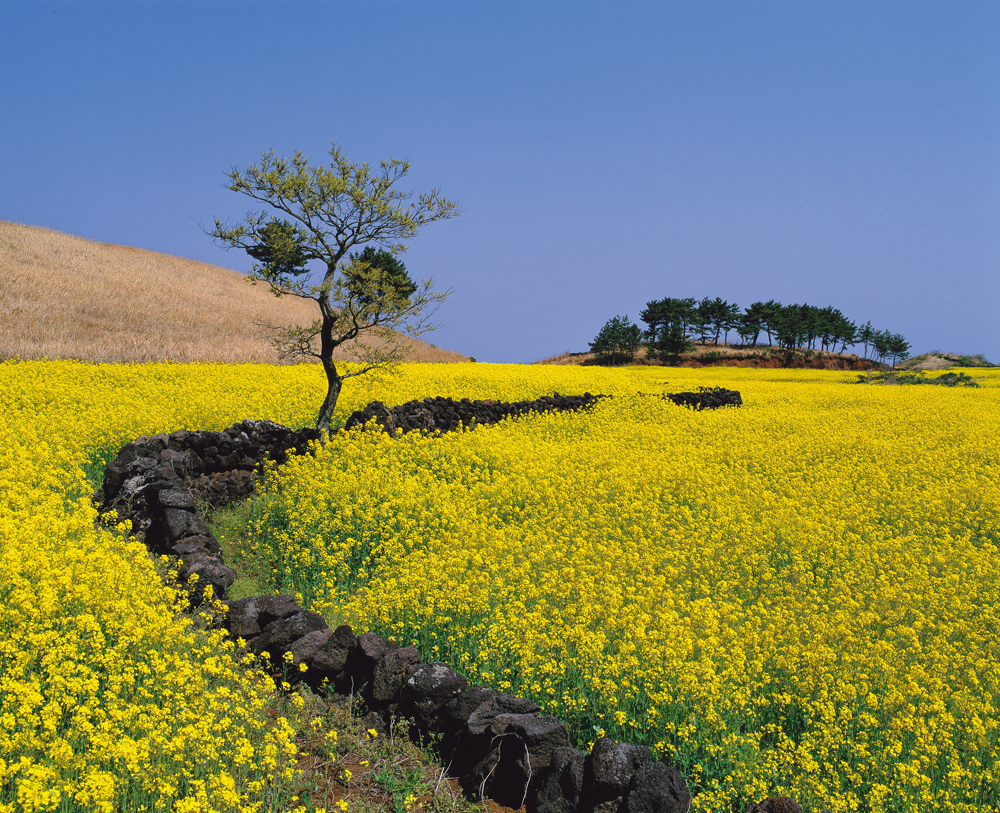
Bright yellow rapeseed plants and batdam are considered a quintessential sight on Jeju.

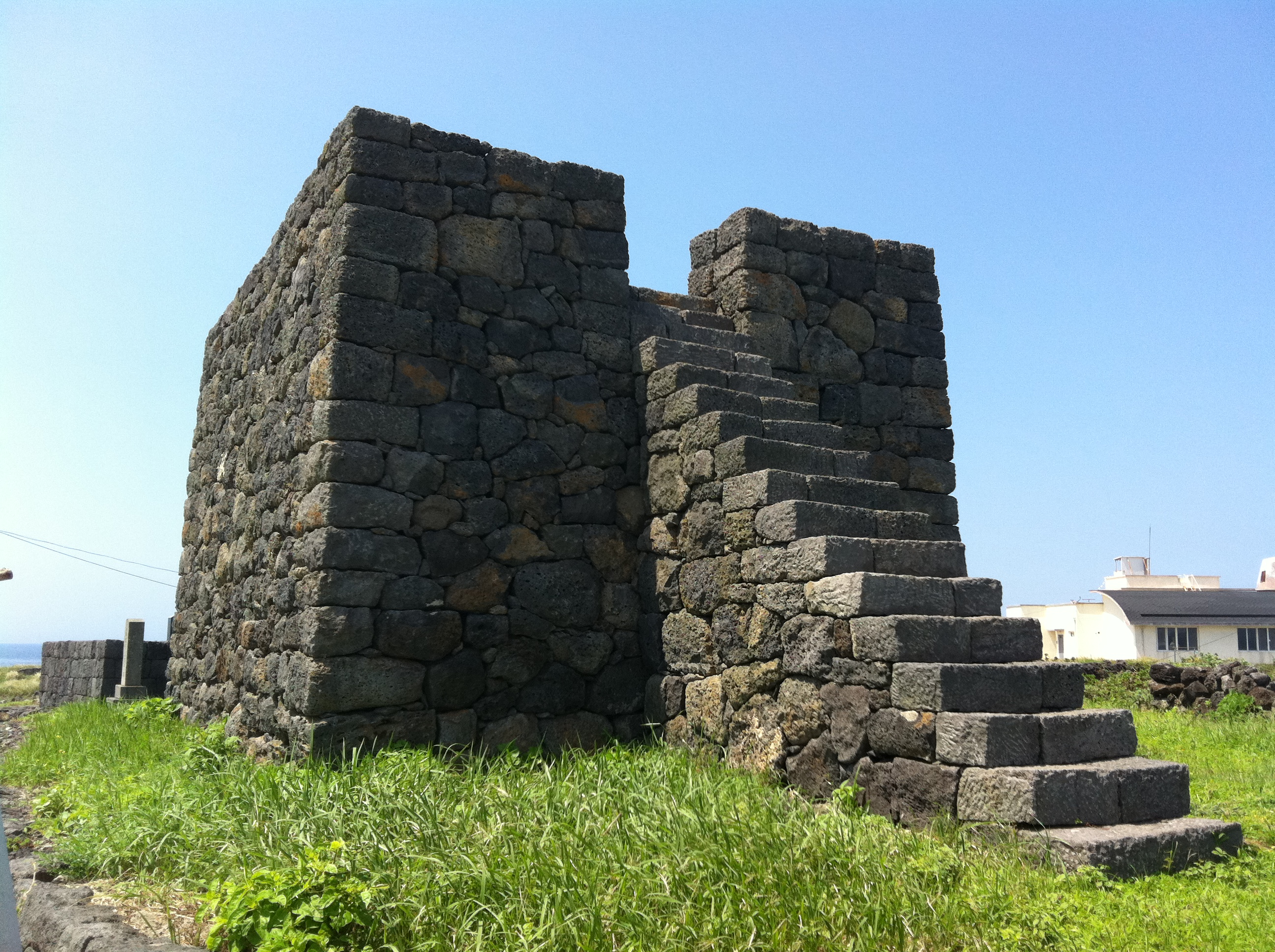
A doldam yeondae, used for smoke signaling

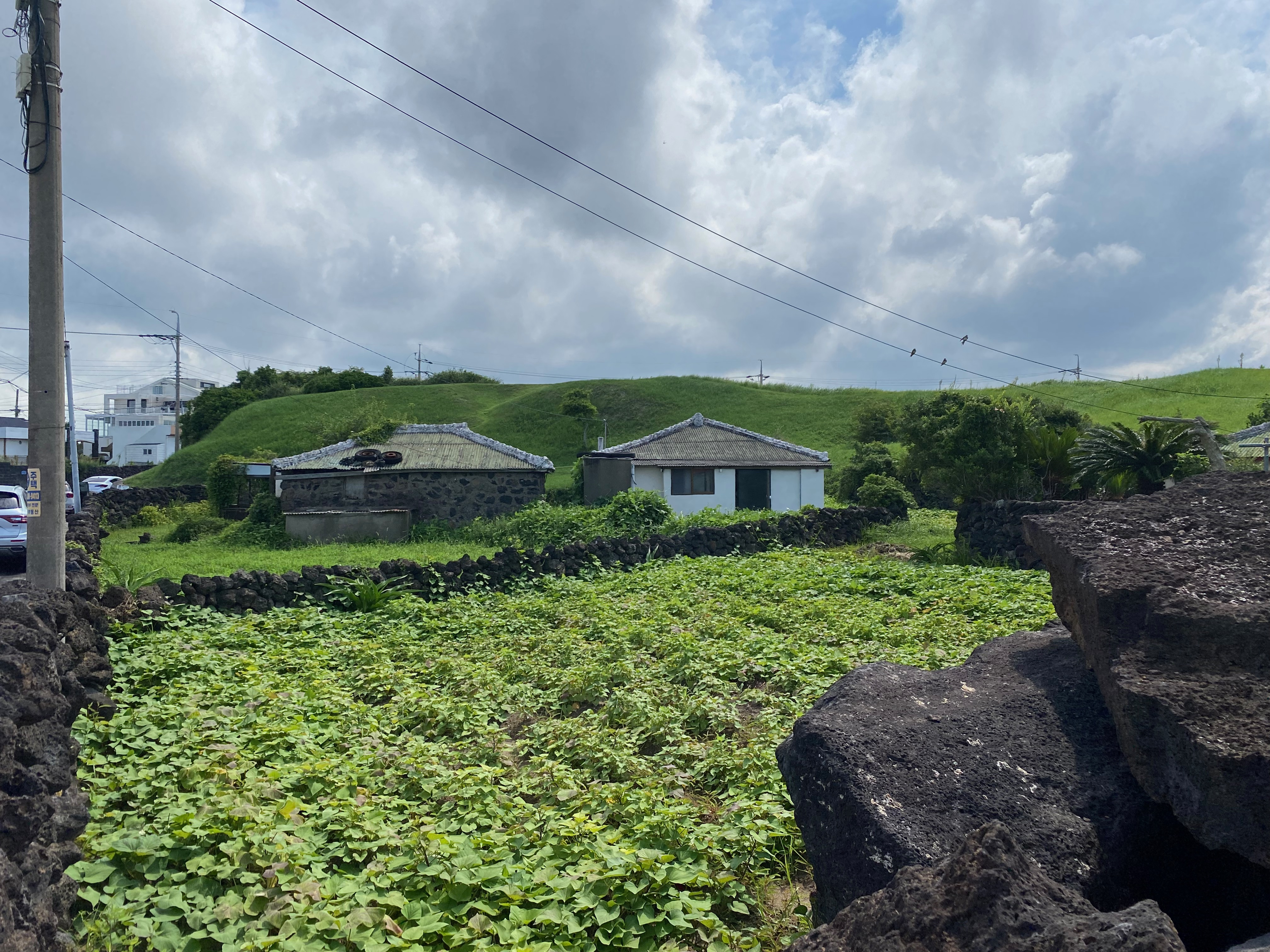
Doldam near Woljeong-ri

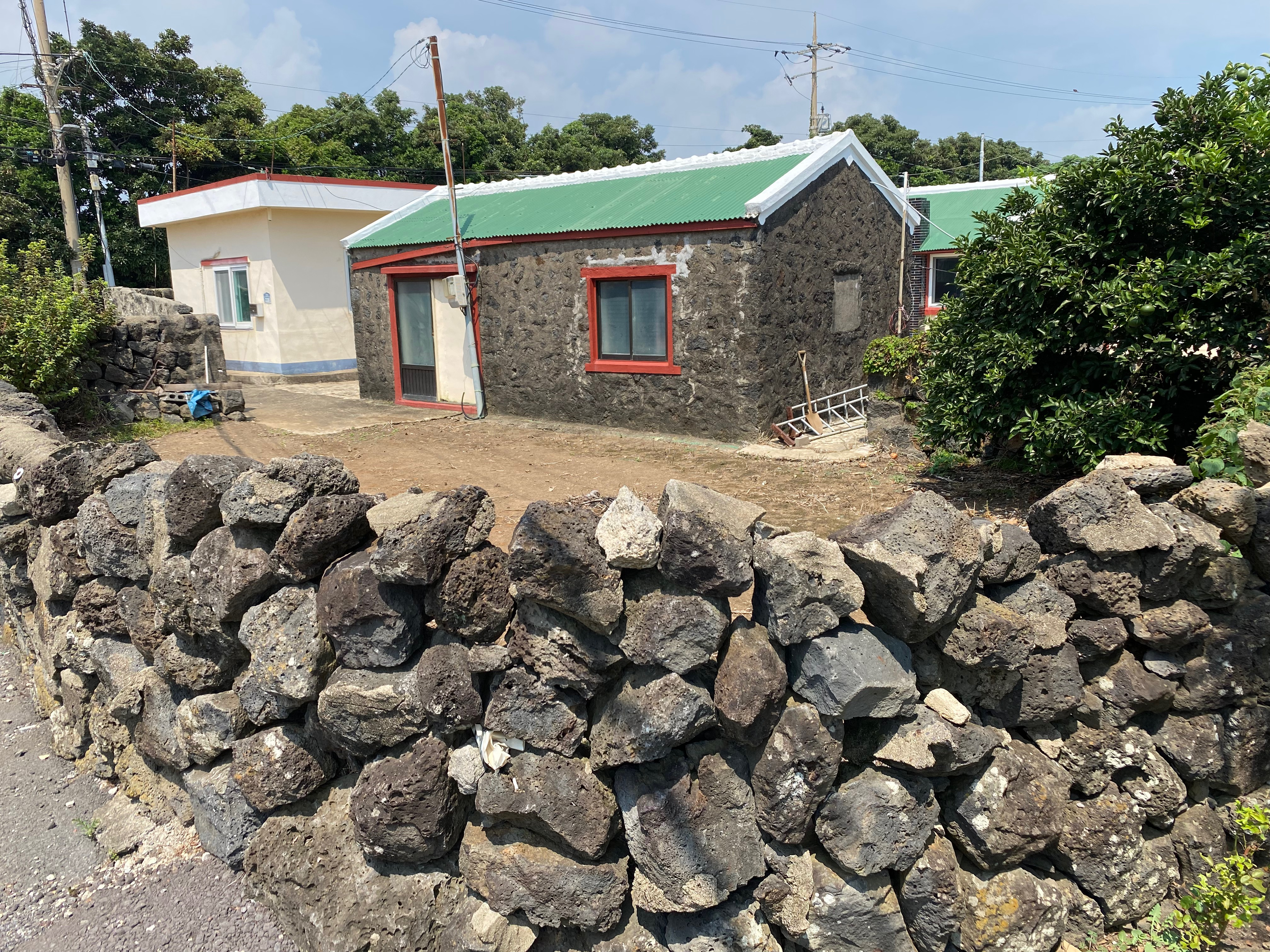
Volcanic stones used for a farmer's home and wall
