= Olle (alley) =

Traditional alleyways in Jeju Province, South Korea

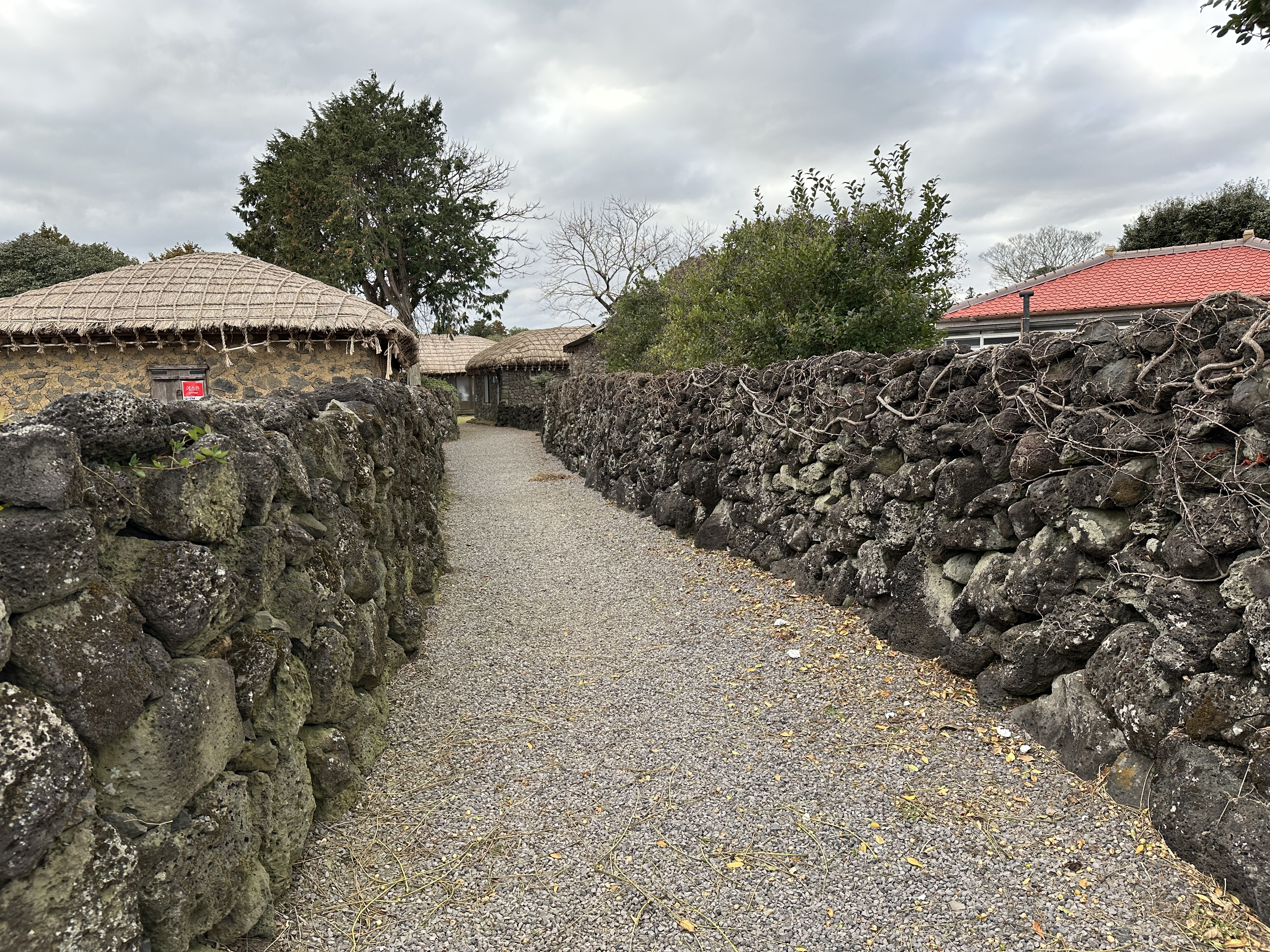
An olle in Seongeup Folk Village

Olle (Jeju: 올레) refers to traditional walled alleyways that connect houses to main paths in Jeju Province, South Korea. They are considered to be part of Jeju's tradition of piled stone structures, called doldam. They are now considered less common, although they are seen as symbols of Jeju.

== Description ==
Olle can be straight, angular, or curvy. Their length also varies; longer ones are more common in rural areas, and shorter ones are common in larger settlements. Olle tend to be 1.8 to 3.0 m (5.9 to 9.8 ft) wide and have barriers 1.2 to 2.1 m (3.9 to 6.9 ft) high. Their length is usually around 6 to 15 m (20 to 49 ft).

The shape of an olle had several properties. They could be designed to block the entrance of wind into the house. They sometimes functionally replaced doors in houses. Traditionally, houses in Jeju did not have doors. This was due to a number of factors: Jeju is humid, hot, and has strong wind storms. Wood doors either rotted or broke in these conditions. Angular or curved olle block the interior of the house from view of the street.

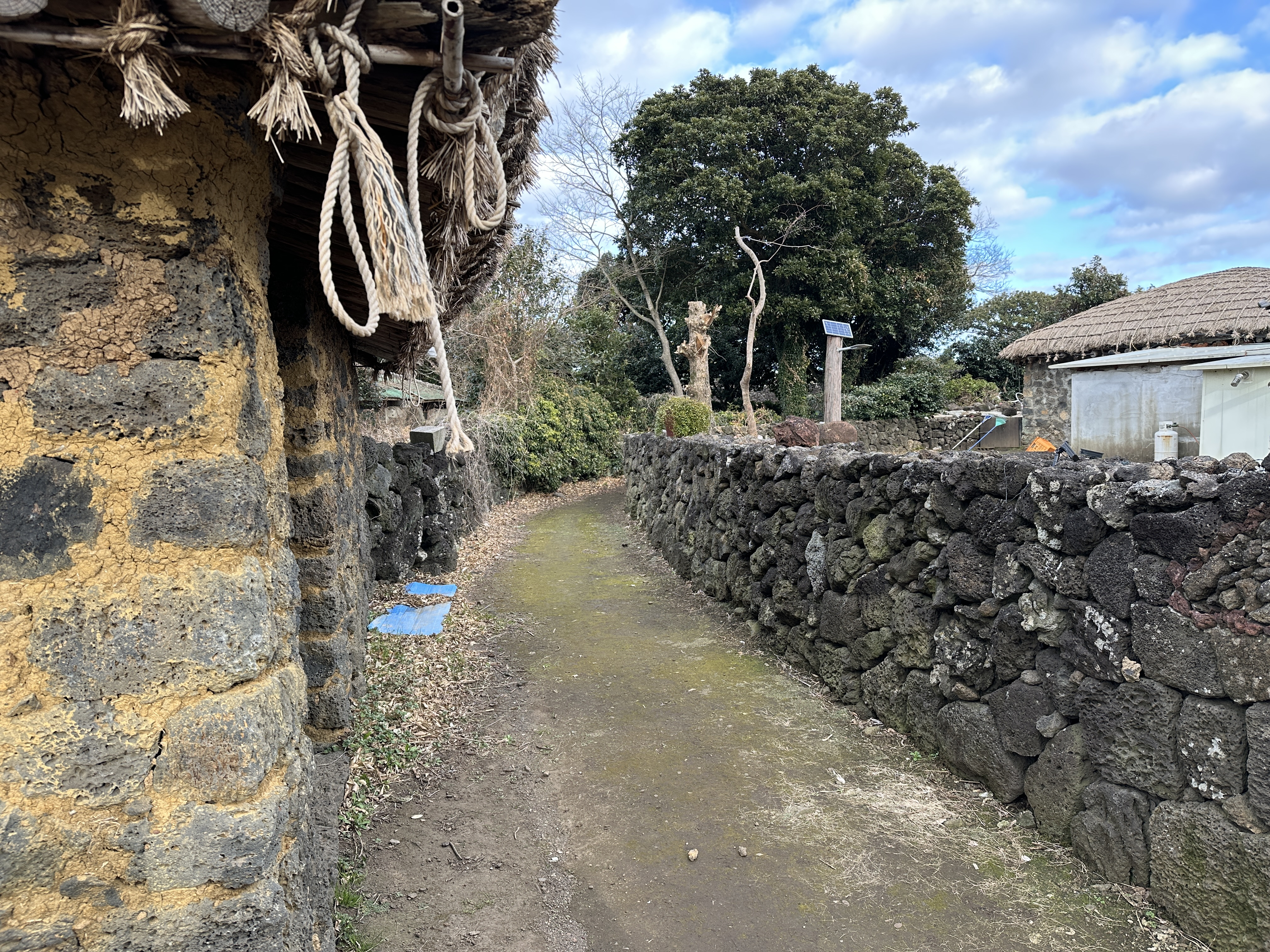
An olle in Seongeup Folk Village

The entrance to an olle is called an eogwi (어귀); these are usually marked in some way, possibly with large stones. The entrance has a jeongnang gate. The path itself is often a mix of large flat stones and dirt. The flat stones, called daripangdol (다리팡돌), are placed there to step on in order to keep one's shoes clean in case the dirt has turned to mud.

The Jeju Olle Trail, a long distance hiking path for tourists, is named for olle. An author and Jeju native that published a book on olle and jeongnang in 2022 expressed gratitude that the Jeju Olle Trail publicized the concept of olle, but argued that the trail caused some confusion about the meaning of "olle". The author argued that olle are relatively private pathways to homes, and not public paths. The Seogwipo Maeil Olle Market is also named for olle.

They are considered to be less common now. Some have lamented their gradual disappearance, and have advocated for their preservation.
