= Jeongnang =

Traditional entrance gates of Jeju, Korea

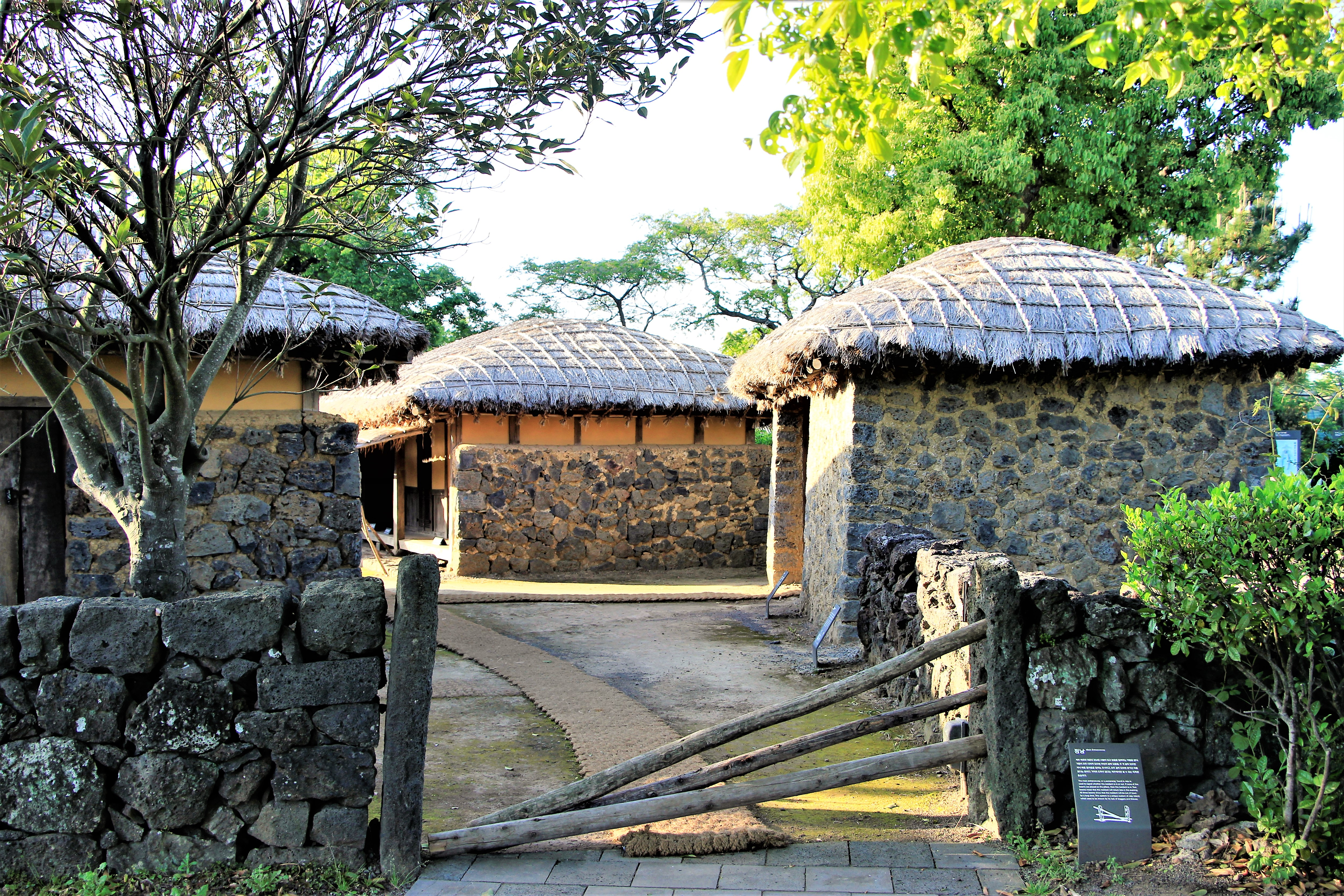
- Jeongnang gate at Chusagwan, the home of poet Kim Jeong-hui when he lived in exile in Jeju. The lowered poles indicate that the owner of the house is at home. (2022)

Korean name
- Hangul: 정낭
- RR: jeongnang
- MR: chŏngnang

Jeongnang (Jeju: 정낭; MR: Chŏngnang) is a term for traditional gates to private homes of Jeju Island, Korea. The gates are typically composed of three parallel wooden poles placed in holes in wood or stone pillars. They have a number of purposes, one of which is to quickly communicate to neighbors if the owner of the house is at home.

There are various regional names for the gates, including jeongnam (정남), jeongsal (정살), jeongsul (정술), and jingnang (징낭). They are now seen as symbolic of Jeju's neighborly traditional culture. These gates are still used today, although less common now.

== Description ==
The gates typically have two base pillars. If the pillars are made of stone, they are called jeongjuseok (정주석). If they're made of wood, they're called either jeongjumok or jeongjumeok (정주목; 정주먹). Parallel sets of holes (one to four, usually circular but squares not uncommon) are cut into the pillars, in which wooden poles (the jeongnang) are placed.

The poles for the gate serve as a barrier, to prevent livestock from passing through the entrance. The poles also served as an entrance barrier sturdier than a traditional gate, that could resist Jeju's strong typhoon winds. The gate often led into a walled alleyway to the house called an olle.

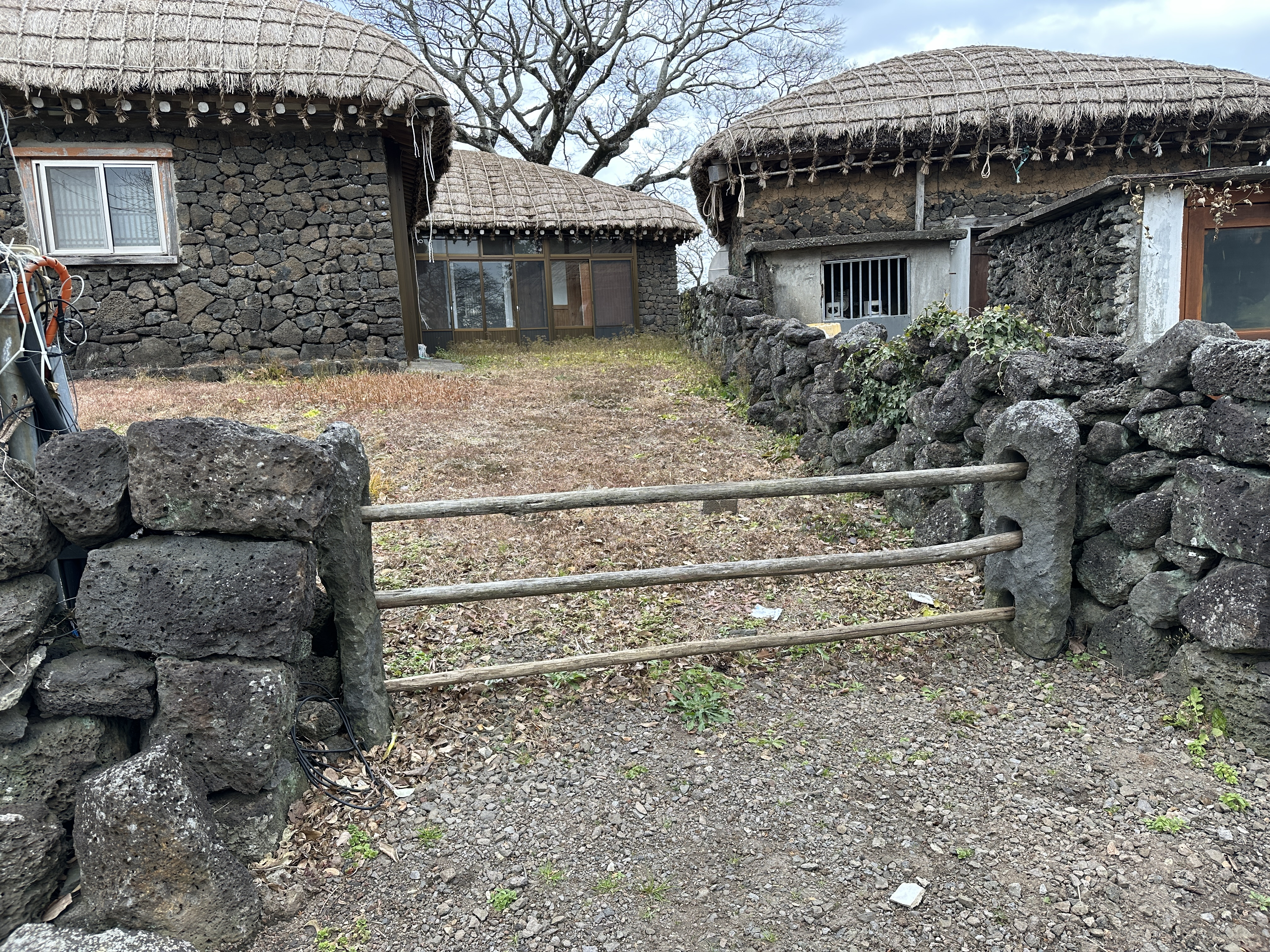
Jeongnang with three horizontal poles (meaning the owner is far from home), at Seongeup Folk Village

The position and number of the poles also served to quickly communicate where the owner of the house was. If all three poles are placed in parallel, then the owner of the house was far from home. If the poles are hanging from one pillar diagonally, then the owner is at home. If two poles are parallel and one hanging, then the owner is away and will be back soon.

=== History ===
The Jeju myth Munjeon bon-puri offers a legendary explanation for the origin of the gates.

They were widespread in Jeju until beginning around the 1970s, when efforts were made to rapidly urbanize and modernize the island. Houses were rebuilt to be more modern, as well as to accommodate the entry and exit of cars. Jeju people have also moved into apartment communities that do not have them.

The gates are still used today, primarily in rural areas. Some houses still have the pillars, although they no longer actively use the poles. Efforts have been made to revive the system. At least one house has been attested to having multiple gates, one modern and one jeongnang, with the latter installed after the former.

The gates are also in use in tourist sites, including in Seongeup Folk Village.

== Interpretations ==
The system has since been interpreted as symbolic of the honesty and neighborly values of Jeju. If the poles signaled that a person was far away, neighbors would know to look after their animals and homes. Openly displaying that a house is empty and unguarded potentially invites thieves, but strong community values override this concern.

Similar looking gates have been attested to in other regions in Asia, including in Nepal and in Indonesia, although authors of one 2022 South Korean paper were not aware if they had the communicative function of Jeju's.

The presence and absence of poles being used to communicate information has been likened to binary numbers in computing.
