= Bangsatap =

Ritual stone piles on Jeju Island, Korea

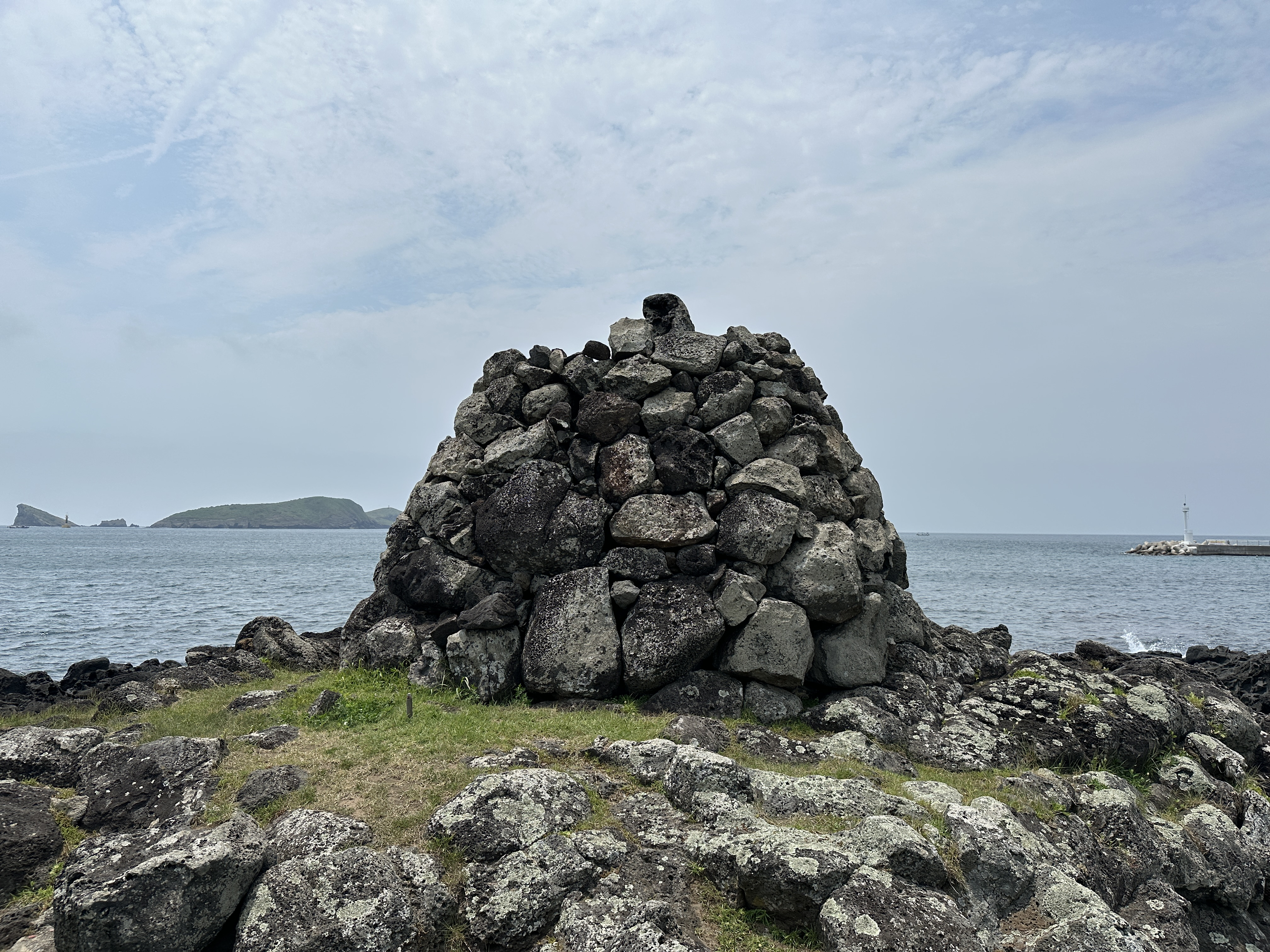
- A bangsatap in Yongsu-ri

Korean name
- Hangul: 방사탑
- Hanja: 防邪塔
- Lit.: protective tower
- RR: bangsatap
- MR: pangsat'ap

Bangsatap (Korean: 방사탑; lit. 'protective tower') are traditional ritual cairns on Jeju Island, in Jeju Province, South Korea. They are now seen as cultural symbols of Jeju.

These cairns were once ubiquitous on Jeju; it is believed that essentially every settlement had at least one, with some having up to five. They significantly declined in usage by the late 20th century. A 2022 news article gave the remaining number of pre-modern bangsatap as 49. In 1997, 17 of them were made Folklore Heritages of Jeju Province, and they are now protected by the local government.

== Etymology ==
The term bangsatap was not commonly used by Jeju natives; there is a large variety of names used by locals, so South Korean academics settled on using the name bangsatap in research.

Locals call the piles a variety of names depending on the region, including dap (답; 塔), tap (탑), geobuk (거북), gamagwi (가마귀), gamaegidongsan (가매기동산), gamagwitdongsan (가마귓동산), geowik (거윅), gamakdongsan (가막동산), yaktap (약탑), maejojagwi (매조자귀), geukdae (극대), hareubang (하르방), geoukdae (거욱대), and geokdae (걱대).

Some locals distinguish between geoukdae and bangsatap only by their placement in the village; their ritual use and form are essentially the same. Geoukdae were to be placed in the south and bangsatap in the north.

== Description ==
A drawing of a typical bangsatap, viewed from the side

The piles are constructed generally of basalt (volcanic rock). They are built in a dry stone fashion: without adhesives. The centers of the piles are filled with rubble. Their forms differ slightly by region. A significant majority of them are conical. Some are shaped like trapezoidal prisms, and some are in miscellaneous shapes. They are generally symmetrical, and are generally 2 to 3 m (6.6 to 9.8 ft) in height and 3 to 4 m (9.8 to 13.1 ft) in diameter.

They are believed to block evil spirits, prevent disease, prevent fires, promote safety at sea, and aid the birth and protection of children.

=== Placement and construction process ===
The piles could be placed in the village according to principles of feng shui, to protect parts of settlements considered vulnerable to evil spirits. As they affected shared areas, they were often constructed as a community effort. People who did not participate in the construction sometimes compensated their lack of participation by paying money or grain to the work effort. Sometimes they were placed in areas where bad or ominous things happened; one was placed near where someone was lost at sea, and another in the 1950s was constructed to ward off disease. They were sometimes placed in opposite cardinal directions. One in Sinheung-ri becomes partially submerged when the tide is high.

Before the bangsatap were constructed, a rice paddle or rice pot was buried underneath the location. This was done symbolically for good luck; rice symbolized wealth, and rice pots were resilient and capable of withstanding fire. They were constructed layer by layer.

It is common (although not universal) practice to place something on top of the bangsatap, such as a wooden or stone bird (crows or hawks) or a stone shaped like a human. These objects were generally made by individuals, and not communally. Wooden objects were made out of wood that was resilient to rotting. The reason for using these birds is uncertain; one colloquial reason given is that crows, which normally are seen as bad luck, would peck and eat bad things.

== History ==
It is unknown when bangsatap were first constructed. They were likely ubiquitous across Jeju before the modern era; a study of place names found that 103 locations on Jeju had names related to the names of bangsatap, leading one researcher to believe that most settlements had at least one bangsatap. Some settlements reportedly had up to five.

They were common until the mid to late 20th century. Many were destroyed during the Jeju uprising and the later economic redevelopment on the island. According to a 1997 survey, 39 remained. A 2022 news article claimed that the Jeju government reported that there were 49 on the island. On August 26, 1995, 17 bangsatap were declared Folklore Heritage of Jeju Province, and are now protected. Of these, 11 are in Jeju City and 6 are in Seogwipo. The remaining bangsatap (20 in Jeju City and 10 in Seogwipo) are Cultural Properties of Jeju Province. Some bangsatap are in varying conditions, or have been torn down over time.

=== New usage ===
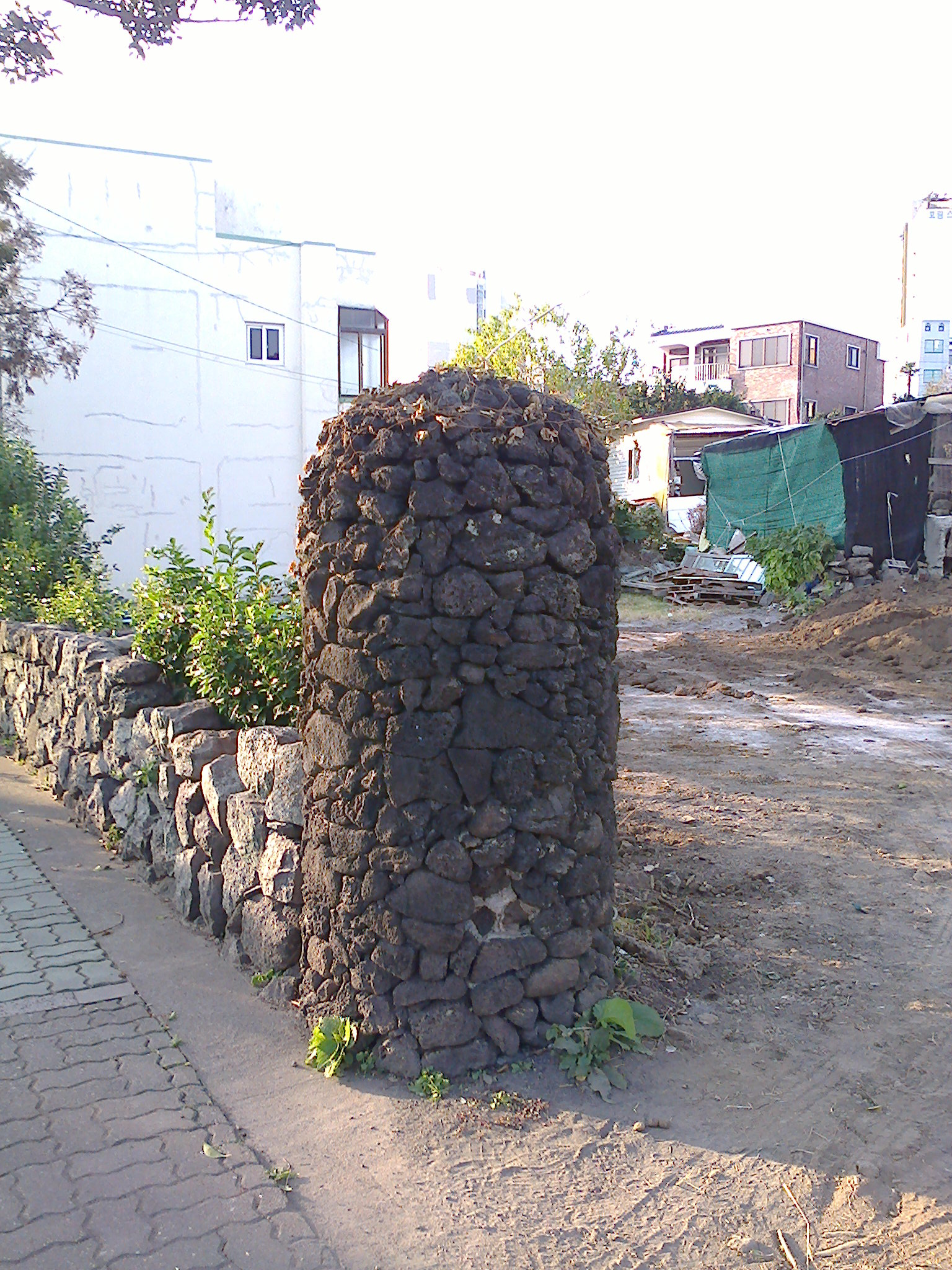
A modern bangsatap (2013)

Some new bangsatap have been created, but they are no longer used for ritual purposes, and are instead displayed as symbols of Jeju's culture.

For the 50th anniversary of the Jeju uprising, a number of bereaved families constructed a memorial bangsatap in Sinsan Park in Jeju City. They had three trucks move eight tons of basalt for the tower, and constructed it by hand. The tower is 7 m (23 ft), 15 m (49 ft) in circumference, and 4.5 m (15 ft) in diameter. A round stone was placed on top, symbolizing reconciliation and coexistence. A yearly memorial ceremony is held each year on April 1 at the bangsatap.

On January 1, 2001, a dol hareubang–shaped time capsule was buried, and is to be opened on January 1, 3001. A 7.5 m (25 ft) tall bangsatap was built on top.
