= Dol hareubang =

Rock statues from Jeju Island

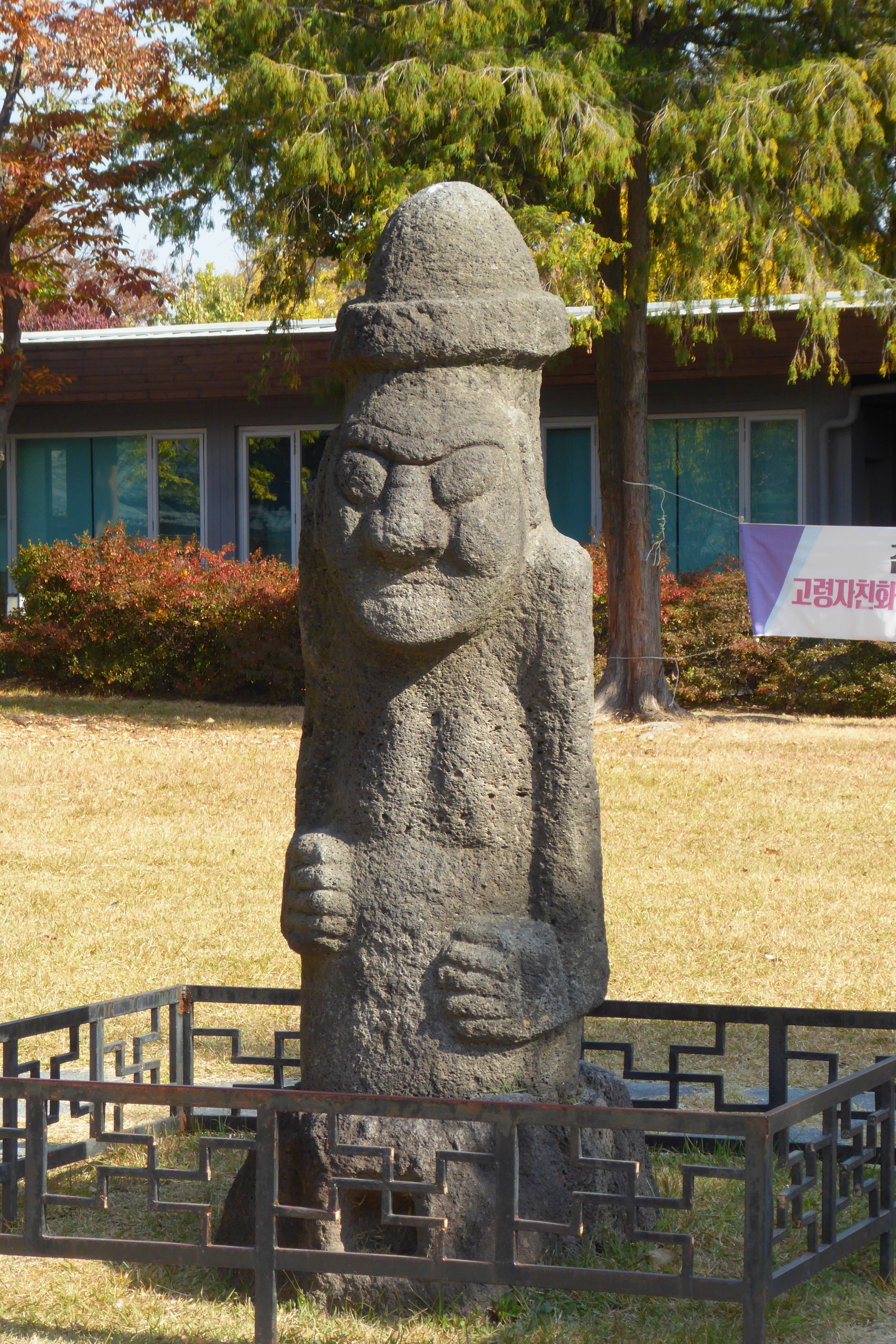
- An authentic dol hareubang on display outside the National Folk Museum of Korea in Seoul

Korean name
- Hangul: 돌하르방
- RR: dolhareubang
- MR: torharŭbang

A dol hareubang (Jejuan: 돌하르방; lit. 'stone grandfather'), alternatively tol harubang, hareubang or harubang, is a type of traditional volcanic rock statue from Jeju Island, South Korea.

It is not known when the statues first began to be made; various theories exist for their origin. They possibly began to be made at latest 500 years ago, since the early Joseon period. Most dol hareubang that can be seen are recent creations and not originals. There are either 47 or 48 original pre-modern statues that are known to exist; most of them are located on Jeju Island.

The statues are traditionally placed in front of gates, as symbolic projections of power and as guardians against evil spirits. They were also symbols and ritual objects for fertility. The statues have been compared to jangseung, traditional wooden totem poles around Korea whose function was similarly to ward off bad spirits. They are now considered symbols of Jeju Island. Recreations of them in miniature and in full size have since been made.

== Names ==
Dol hareubang is a term in the Jeju language, and means "stone grandfather". The term was reportedly not common until recently, and was mostly used by children. It was decided by the Jeju Cultural Property Committee in 1971 to make dol hareubang the official term for the statue, and this name has since become the predominant one.

The statues have gone by a significant variety of names that were possibly regional and dependent on the characteristics of the statues. Names including useongmok (우석목; 偶石木), museongmok (무석목; 武石木), ongjungseok (옹중석; 翁仲石), beoksumeori (벅수머리), dolyeonggam (돌영감), sumunjang (수문장), janggunseok (장군석), dongjaseok (동자석), and mangjuseok (망주석). The name useongmok was possibly the most common.

== Description ==
Each dol hareubang has different features and sizes, but they tend to share some commonalities. They are made of volcanic stone, and often depict figures wearing a round hat. This round hat is said to make the statue phallic, and thus a symbol of fertility. They tend to have large eyes, closed mouths, and one shoulder raised higher than the other. Their expressions have been described as stern, dignified, or humorous. Some have big ears, and some have hands placed either in front, on their stomachs, or around their backs.

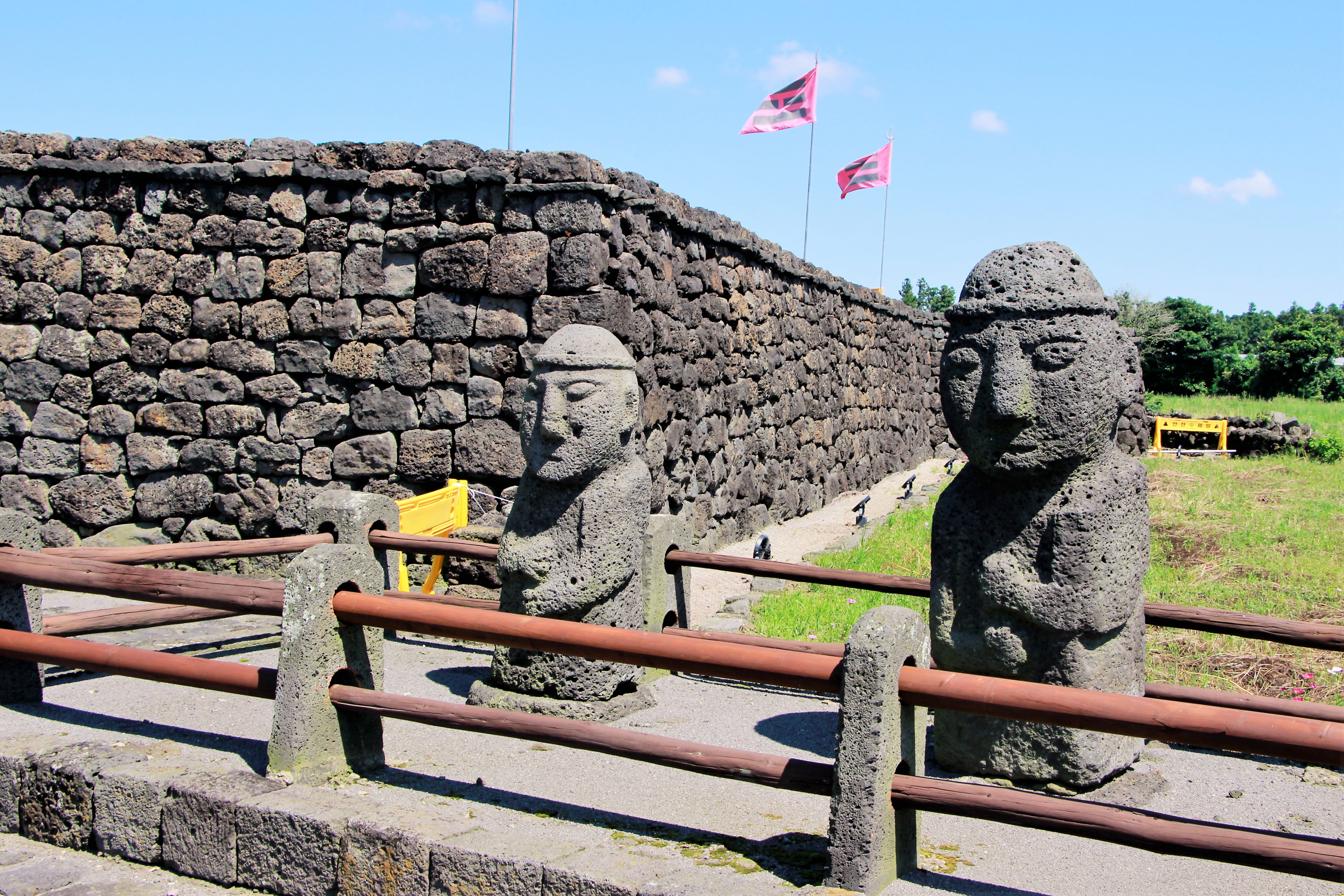
Authentic Jeongeuihyeon style dol hareubang guarding a gate at Seongeup Folk Village (2021)

The statues were often erected at the entrance of fortresses (and thus at the boundaries of settlements), facing each other. They often had grooves in them for placing wooden logs in. The position of these logs signaled whether entrances were open or closed to passersby, as per the jeongnang system used around Jeju. The statues projected images of power and security, and also served superstitious function in warding off bad spirits. Some people reportedly paid their respects to the statues whenever they passed.

There are some commonalities shared between the dol hareubang of three Joseon-era historical regions of Jeju, although there is still intra-regional variance. Dol hareubang in Jeju-seong and Jeongeuihyeon-seong tend to be standing on stone platforms called giseok (기석; 基石), but those in Daejeonghyeon-seong do not.

Average statistics of dol hareubang by region
Joseon-era region	Height (cm)	Head length (cm)	Stone platform height (cm)
Jeju-seong	181.6	89.0	42.2
Daejeonghyeon-seong	136.2	66.5	N/A
Jeongeuihyeon-seong	141.4	65.9	30.3

There are reportedly either 47 or 48 extant pre-modern dol hareubang. In Jeju City, there are 21. In Seongeup-ri in Seogwipo, there are 12. Across Inseong-ri, Anseong-ri, and Boseong-ri there are 12. In the National Folk Museum of Korea in Seoul, there are 2 that were originally from Jeju City. It is reportedly not known with certainty when most of these statues were produced. The statues were reportedly moved around over time, which caused wear-and-tear and made it difficult to place where they were originally from.

They also served other superstitious functions. One folk belief had it that, if a woman was experiencing issues with infertility, she could secretly take parts of a statue's nose, grind it into a powder, then consume the powder to improve her fertility. Many statues reportedly have worn noses due to this belief. Some reportedly believe that touching the nose of the statue improves fertility.

== History ==
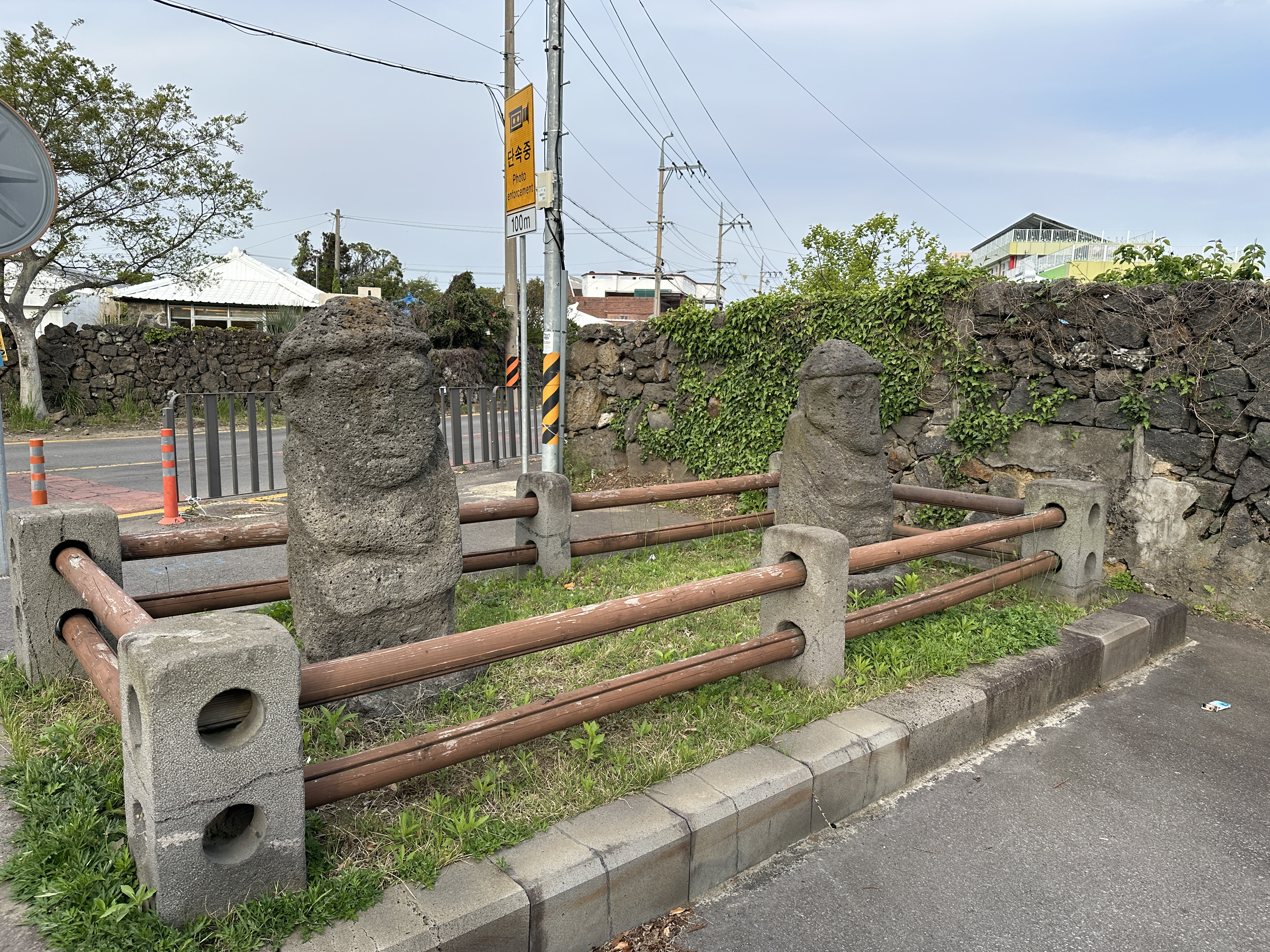
Authentic Daejeonghyeon-style dol hareubang

The origin of dol hareubangs is unclear, with at least three theories surrounding it. Records surrounding the number and location of the statues from before 1914 are reportedly sparse. One theory has it that a sea-faring people brought the statues to Jeju. A second theory argues that the statues developed from jangseung or beoksu (벅수) statues.

Around 1416 (during the Joseon period), 6 dol hareubang in three pairs reportedly existed on the island. By 1754, there were reportedly 48 statues; 24 of these were at Jeju-mok (now Jeju City), with 4 pairs each at the fortress's west, south, and east gates.

Some scholars argue the earliest known dol hareubang in their current form were created in 1754. There is a record that dol hareubang (called ongjungseok) statues were built in 1754 in Jeju-mok. The creation of the statues was reportedly motivated by a belief that, after several famines in the reigns of kings Sukjong and Yeongjo, vengeful spirits were roaming and tormenting the living. The head of Jeju-mok then ordered that the statues be built. It is not clear whether these were the earliest occurrences of the statues.

During the 1910–1945 Japanese colonial period, the statues were reportedly disregarded and moved around. This pattern reportedly continued into the rapid urban development after the liberation of Korea. Research on the statues occurred in the 1960s, and two of them were moved to the National Folk Museum of Korea in 1968.

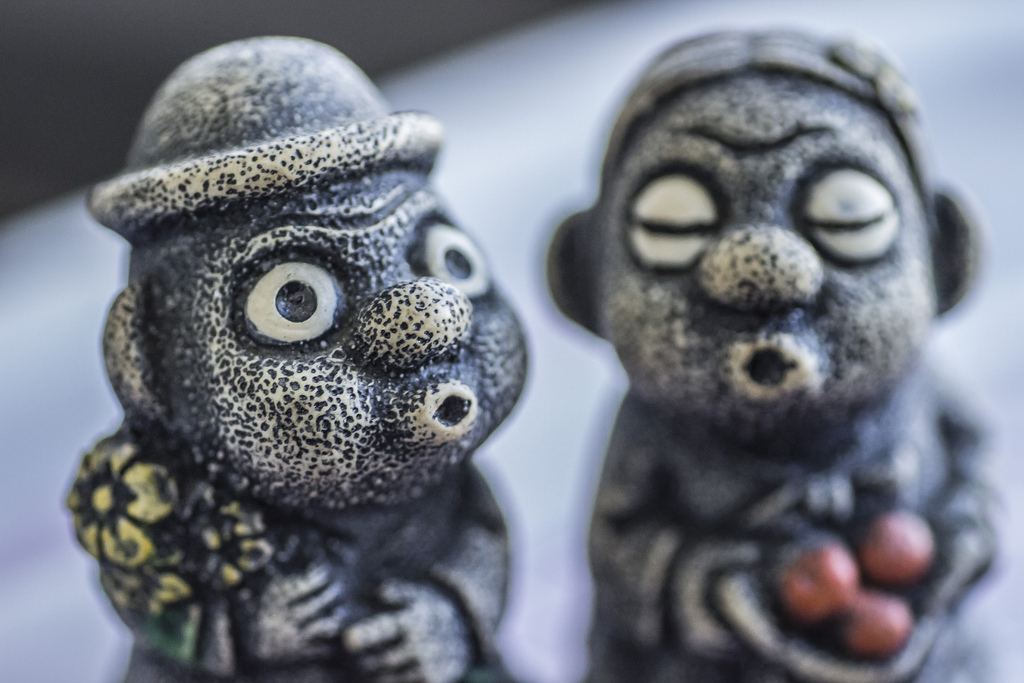
Modern small sculptures inspired by dol hareubang (2014)

In recent years, the statue has become a symbol of Jeju Island. The first time a dol hareubang souvenir was created was reportedly in 1963, by sculptor Song Jong-Won. Song made a 25 cm (9.8 in) tall replica of a statue at the south gate of Jeju-mok. Tourist goods now widely feature the statues, with miniature to full-sized statues being sold.

During the 1991 Soviet-South Korean summit on Jeju Island, Soviet leader Mikhail Gorbachev was given a dol hareubang as a gift. In 2002, a statue was gifted to Laizhou in China, and in 2003 another was gifted to the city hall of Santa Rosa, California in the United States.

== See also ==
- Kurgan stelae
- Korean shamanism
- Shigandang
- Seonangdang
- Moai
- Religion in Korea
