= Seongeup Folk Village =

Folk village in Seogwipo, South Korea

Seongeup Folk Village 성읍민속마을
- Folk village
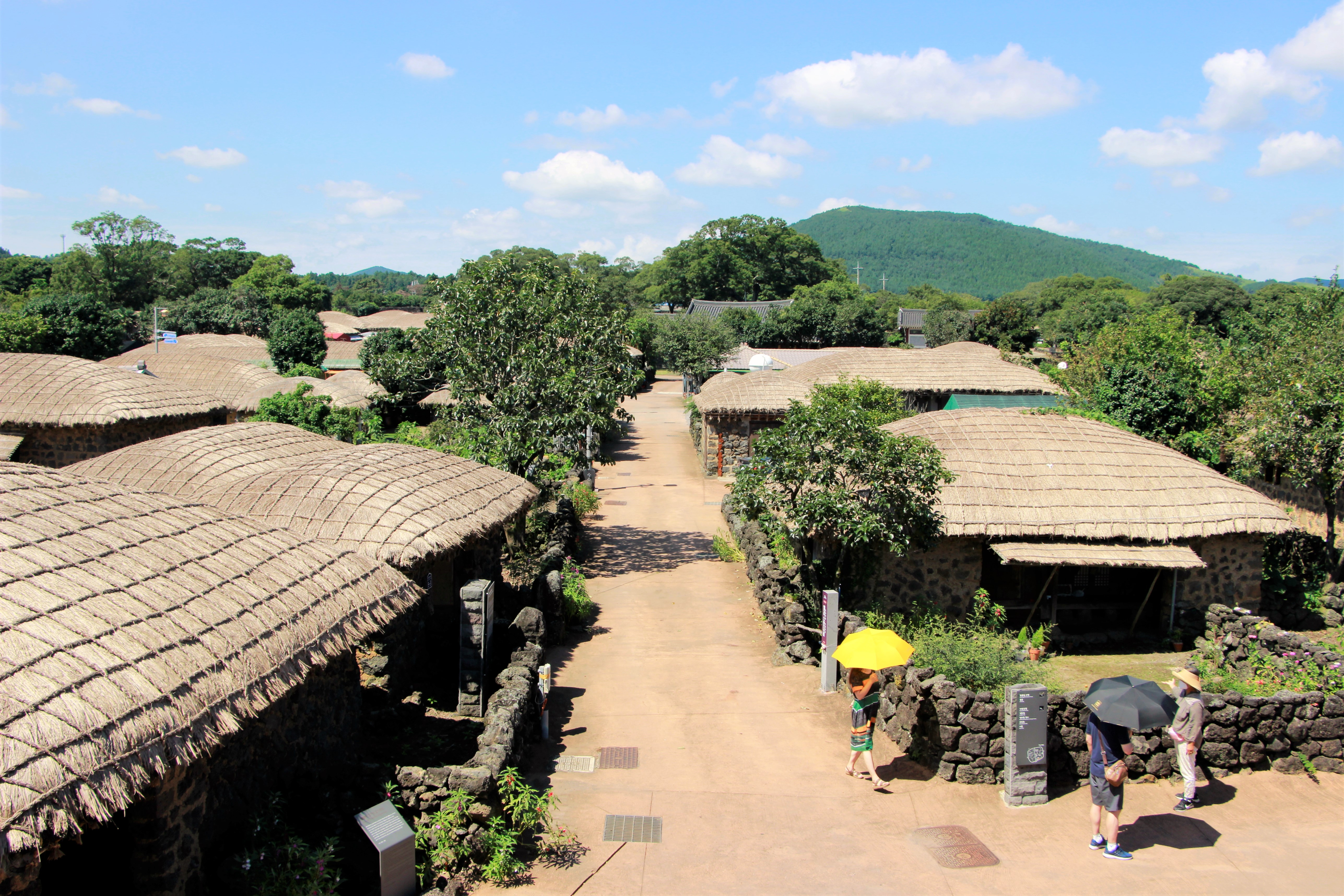
- Part of the village, viewed from the south gate (2021)
- Interactive map of Seongeup Folk Village
- Coordinates: 33°23′12″N 126°47′7″E
- Country: South Korea
- Province: Jeju Province
- City: Seogwipo
- County: Pyoseon-myeon

Seongeup Folk Village (Korean: 성읍민속마을) is a traditional Korean folk village in Pyoseon-myeon, Seogwipo, Jeju Province, South Korea. It has been continually inhabited for around 600 years, since the 15th century, and is maintained to resemble its traditional pre-modern form.

The entire village, as well as several individual buildings inside it, are National Folklore Cultural Heritages of South Korea. Two trees in it are Natural Monuments of South Korea.

== Description ==
The village is an authentic Korean walled town (읍성; eupseong) that dates to at latest the early Joseon period. It was the county office beginning in 1423, during the reign of Sejong the Great. It was continually used as an administrative center until 1914. It was once much larger than its current form, with reportedly around 1,500 households. It waned in influence by the 1930s.

The village is filled with hanok, traditional Korean buildings. There was a major fire in 1826, where around 80 buildings were destroyed, and there was another fire in 1948 during the Jeju uprising. Some buildings in the village have survived both these incidents, and date to the early 19th century. The town is designed according to the principles of feng shui, and is designed and placed with its defense in mind. The town's walls are well-preserved. The town's houses often have olle, walled alleyways from the street to the house. The olle in the town are considered to be unusually short. There are now around 110 structures in the village.

=== Tourism ===
The village now offers historical and cultural experiences. Visitors can participate in trying on hanbok (traditional Korean clothing), archery, dyeing cloth, and shopping for crafts. There are restaurants that serve snacks and traditional Korean and Jeju foods. One Jeju family-run business has brewed the alcoholic beverage omegisul in the village for multiple generations. Their business was interrupted when home distillation of alcohol was prohibited during the Japanese colonial period.

The village holds a yearly Jeongeui-gol Folk Festival (정의골한마당축제) each October. The village has hosted reenactments of ceremonies on a number of occasions, such as processions for the inauguration of the county governor and wedding ceremony reenactments. The village has also hosted local talent competitions. The local government is continuing to invest in renovations and more cultural experiences for the village. Some residents are negotiating with the government to allow for more modern renovations to the traditional buildings that they occupy in the village.

== Gallery ==
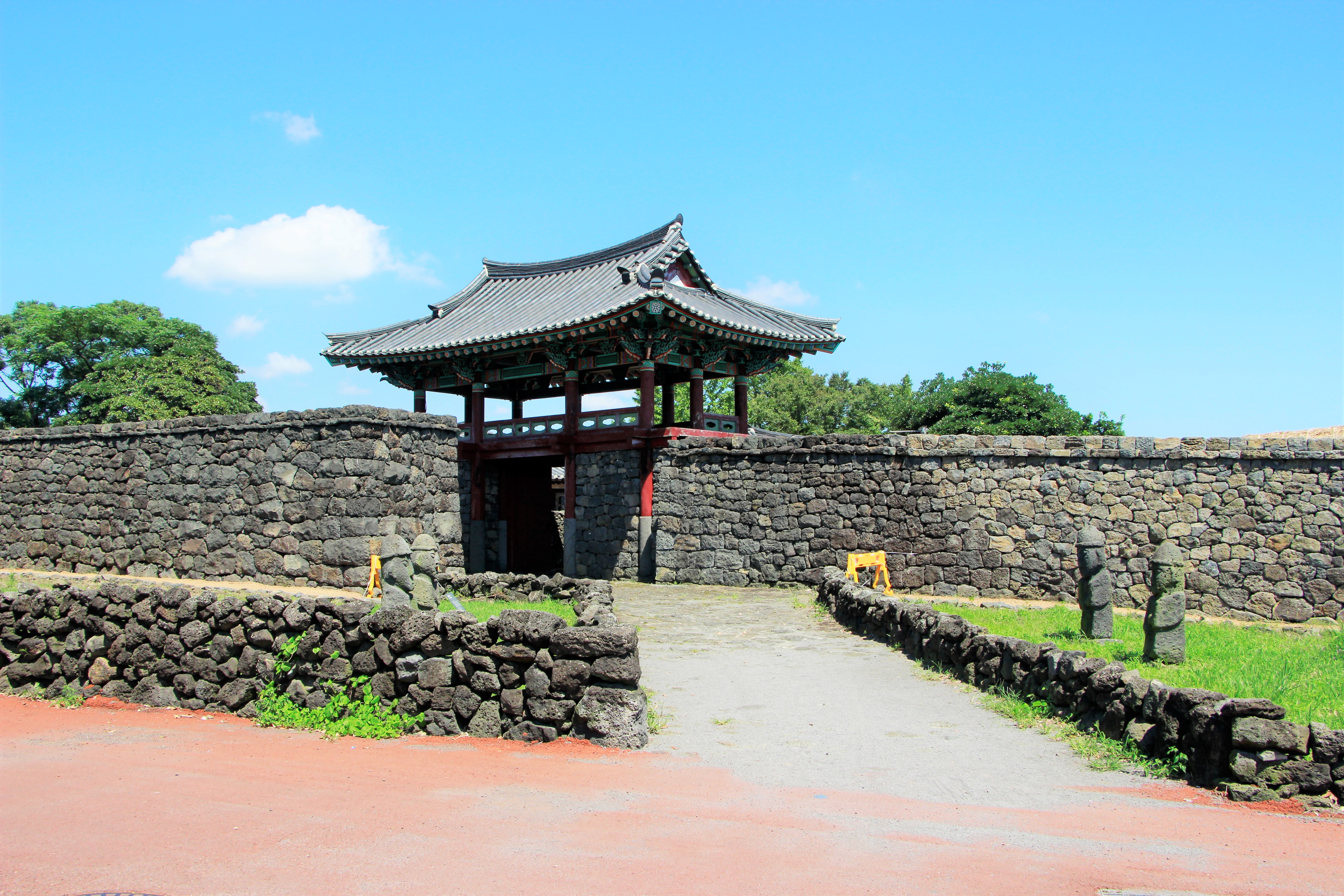
The south gate of the town, with dol hareubang statues visible to the right (2021)

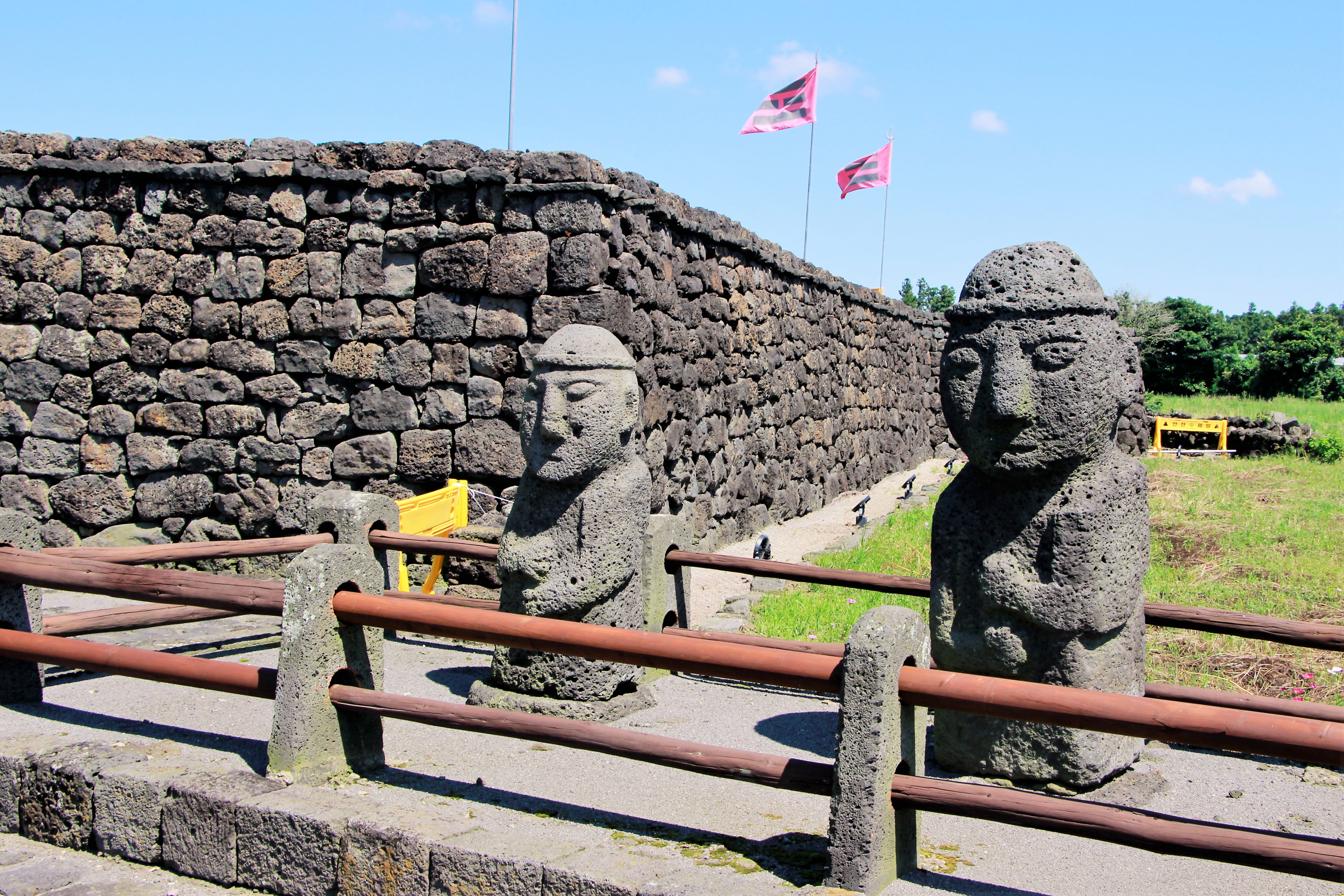
Dol hareubang statues at the south gate (2021)

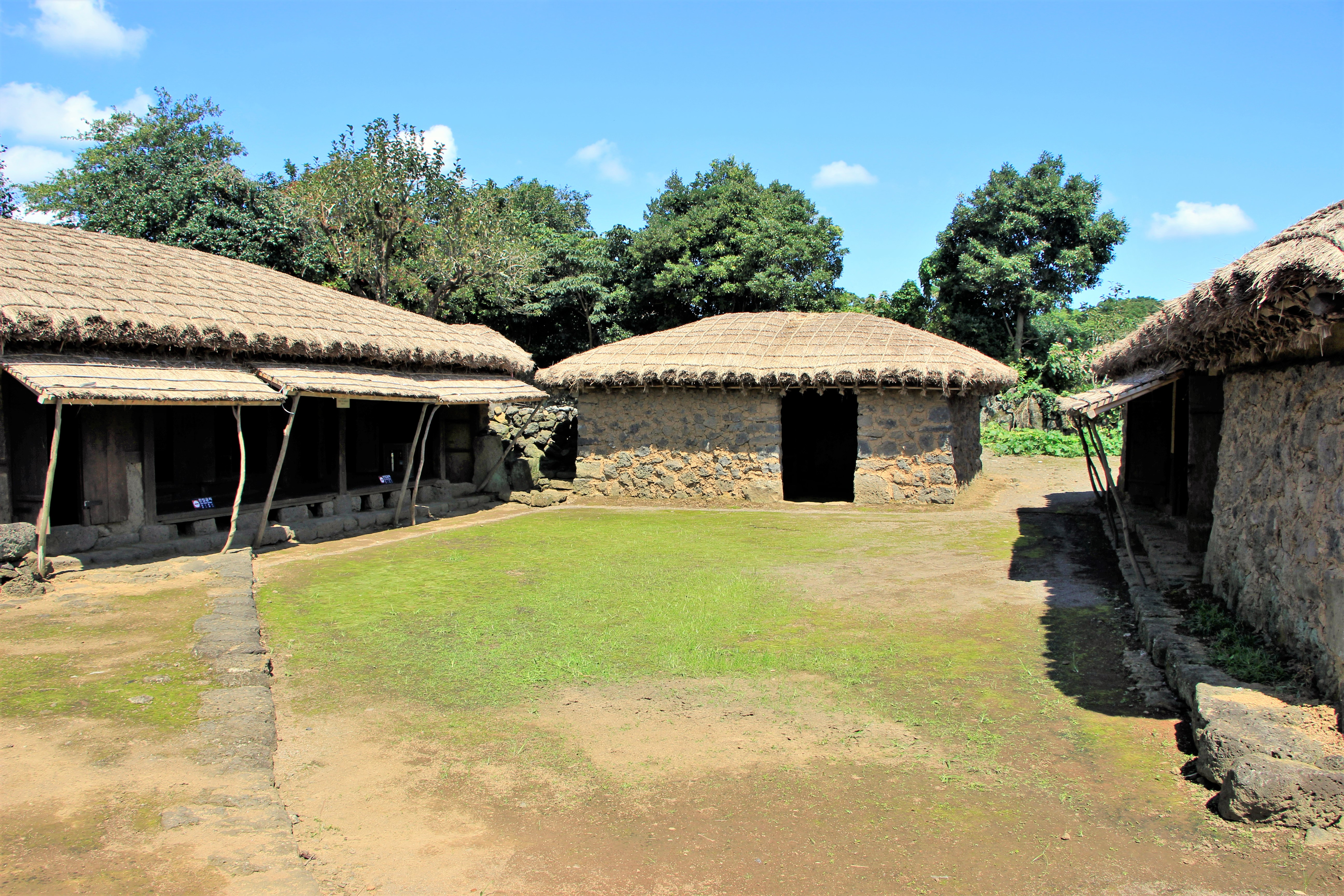
Houses in the town (2021)

== See also ==
- Jeju Stone Park – this park in Jeju City has a folk village as well
