= Jeju horse =

Horse breed of Jeju Island, South Korea

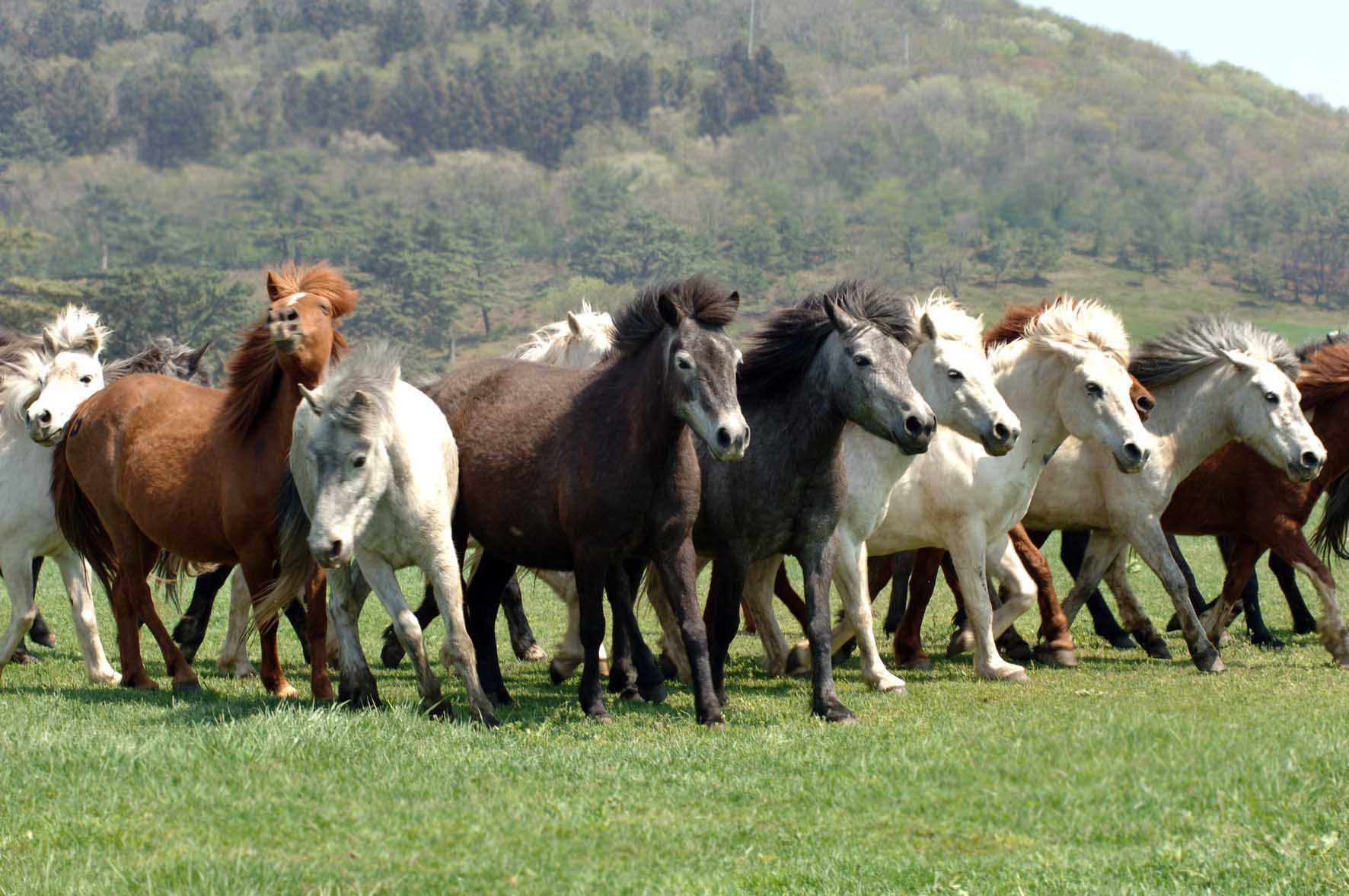
- Country of origin: Korea

The Jeju horse (Korean: 제주마; Hanja: 濟州馬; RR: Jejuma) is a horse breed native to the Jeju Island in South Korea. In a diverse array of types, each is identified differently depending on its coat color. Jeju horses mature well in harsh conditions due to their strength and fitness. With an outstanding tolerance of low temperatures, they have been mostly pastured without the need for horse blankets or stables.

Jeju horses were once considered to be endangered. Following the nation's industrialization period of the 1960s, Jeju horses became impractical to use with the distribution of new agricultural machinery and developments in means of transportation. In response, the government of the Republic of Korea designated the Jeju horse as Natural Monument No. 347 in 1986, designating for protection the 64 horses then recognised as purebred – 55 mares and 9 stallions – in a 133-hectare reserve.

In 2000, the Jeju Stockbreeding Promotion Institute was appointed by the national government to register and manage the pedigrees of the Jeju horses owned by local farming households. Since then, a total of 2,080 Jeju horses has been registered with the institute for their pedigrees.

== Breed characteristics ==
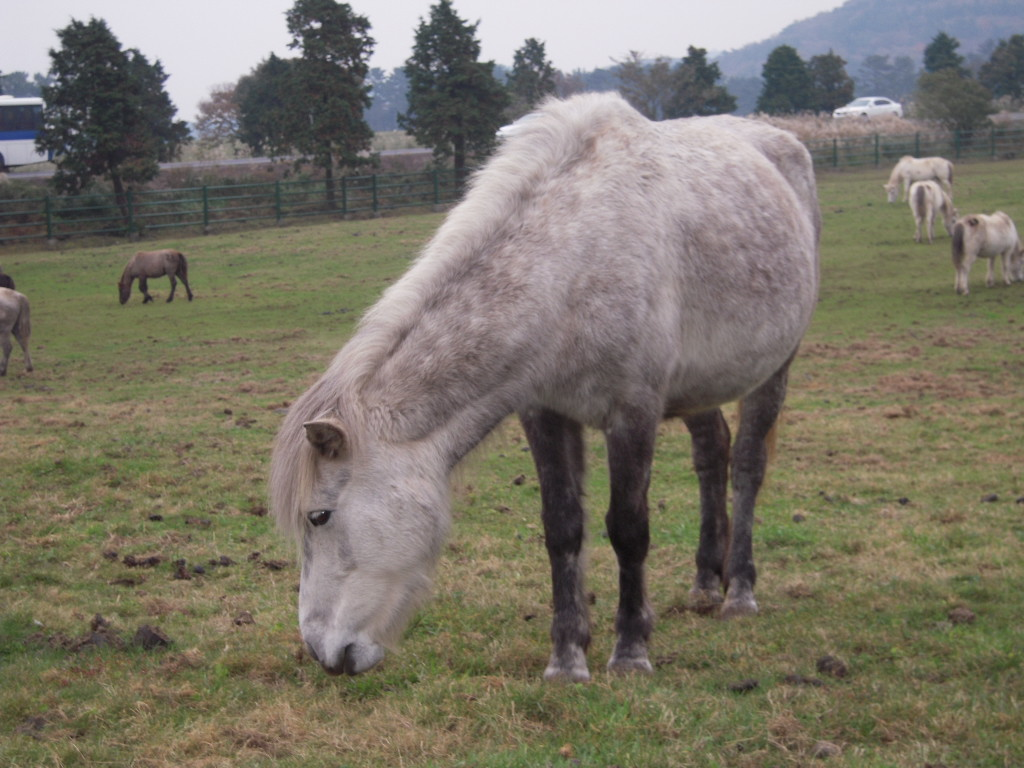
Jeju horse grazing

The Jeju horse is a small to medium-sized breed with a large head and a thick neck. It has a block-shaped body with a relatively long torso compared with its height measured from the ground to the withers or hip. They were traditionally used as farm and draft horses because of their remarkable stamina and endurance, while current breeds are used for racing and riding. With firm and thick hooves, they run without the need for horseshoes.

Stallions range from 121.8 to 128.9 cm (12.0 to 12.3 h; 48.0 to 50.7 in), while mares usually stand between 113.2 and 127.3 cm (11.1 and 12.2 h; 44.6 and 50.1 in). The typical lengths of both genders lie between 122.3 and 124.5 cm (12.0 and 12.1 h; 48.1 and 49.0 in), and on average, they weigh 230 to 330 kg (510 to 730 lb).

== Coat colors ==
The Jeju horse exhibits a range of colors, which determine the names of the types, along with the characteristics of each body part. The coat color also forms a standard to distinguish each type.

- Garama (가라마, black): The entire coat color is black.
- Jeokdama (적다마, chestnut): The entire coat color is light brown or copper.
- Wallama (월라마, pinto): The basic coat color is white with black or bay spots.
- Yuma (유마, bay): The overall coat color is chestnut or brown, while the color of mane, tail, and lower legs is black.
- Chongma (총마, gray): The entire coat color is white, but may have some bay, chestnut, and black sprinkled through the white.
- Gonggolma (공골마, sorrel): The coat is chestnut with a cream-colored mane and tail.
- Gorama (고라마, fallow or dun): The entire coat color is light brown with a black dorsal stripe stretching from mane to tail and with black lower legs.
- Buruma (부루마, roan): The coat color is a mixture of bay, chestnut, and black with white. It has less white hair than Chongma, and the legs especially exhibit the basic coat color without white spots.
- Geoheulma (거흘마, spotted): The colors around its eyes, lower abdomen, and legs are lighter or whiter than that of the rest of the coat.
- Jaheulma (자흘마, speckled): The coat has different sizes of freckles scattered over its entire body.

Horses with the same coat color are often named differently depending on the tone of the color. The position of a white spot also creates other names as follows:

- Ganjeoni (간전이): It has a white line stretching from forehead to nose.
- Gollimae (골리매): It has circles around its eyes that resemble glasses.
- Gwangganjeoni (광간전이) or Wangganjeoni (왕간전이): It has a broad white line stretching from forehead to nose.
- Myeonbaegi (면백이): It has a white face.
- Myeonjogi (면조기): It has hairless ankles.
- Mokhani (목하니): It has white spots around its neck.
- Satoongi (사퉁이): One of its eyes is angled in.
- Iongi (이옹이): It has a crooked tail that exposes its anus.
- Jeopsoogi (접수기): It has lower withers with a higher back.
- Jokbari (족발이): It limps with one of its legs a bit shorter than the others.
- Pimari (피마리): It has a white spot on its nose.
- Hwaldeungi (활등이): It has a deep-set back.

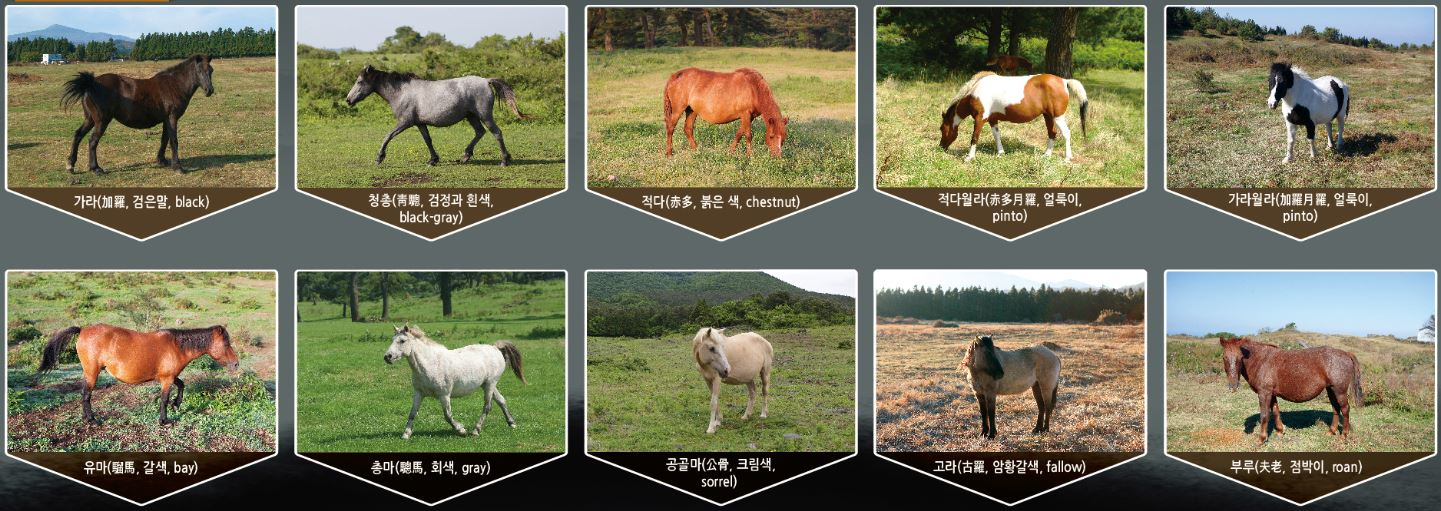
Jeju horse (Coat colors)

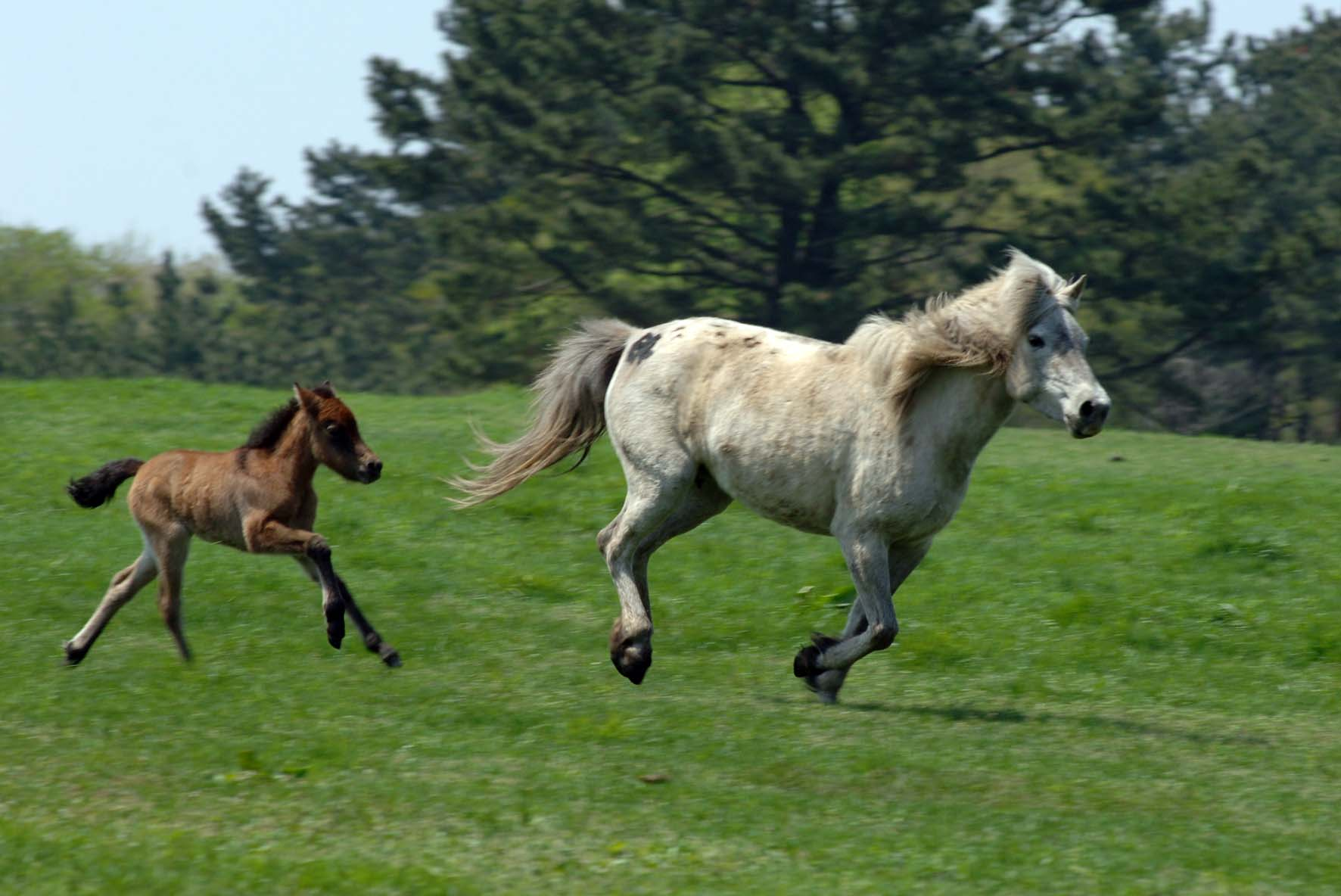
Jeju horse (mare and foal)

A stallion reaches suitable breeding age by roughly three to four years old, and a three-year-old mare is in the best breeding condition during the spring. The official breeding period lasts for 25 years. Jeju horses belong to long-day breeders, whose mating occurs from March to August in Jeju. The estrous cycle is 20 to 24 days (e.g. 22 days on average), and the estrus usually lasts 4 to 11 days (e.g. 7 days on average). Within 7 to 10 days (e.g. 8 days on average) after delivery, the mare undergoes another estrus, which reoccurs every 22 days.

== History ==
From the examination of horse teeth that were excavated from shell middens in Gwakji-ri and in Handeulgul Cave in Wollyeong-ri, horses are estimated to have been on Jejudo Island since the end of the Stone Age or the beginning of the Bronze Age. A historical document of the Goryeo dynasty, recorded in 1073 AD (the 27th year of the reign of King Munjong) states that an excellent steed was presented to the king from Jeju, which indicates Jeju has a long history of breeding horses. Systematic management of Jeju horses at a national level started in 1276 when a state-run facility, Tamna Ranch, was constructed to accommodate 160 horses imported from Mongolia.

According to another record, Jeju continued to import Mongolian horses for more than a century, until 1374. In the ancient times, Jeju provided horses upon the central government's request and bred around 20,000 horses. Starting in the 1960s, the usability of horses decreased as other means of transportation developed. In addition, the Korea Racing Authority introduced other breeds, such as the Anglo-Arabian and the Thoroughbred in late 1970s to produce racehorses. Some of the foreign-bred stallions were used to create crossbred horses, which contributed to the decreased number of native Jeju horses.

In mid-1980s, the population of the Jeju horse dropped to around 1,200. In 1986, the central government designated the horse as Natural Monument No. 347, named Jeju Horse of Jeju, to prevent it from extinction and to preserve its breeds as state-designated cultural properties. Currently, more than 150 native Jeju horses are being raised within a protection area. In 2000, the government appointed the Jeju Stockbreeding Promotion Institute as a designated agency to register and breed Jeju horses. It also established the Rules on the Registration and Management of Jeju Horses to maintain their pedigrees. An electronic chip is implanted into a newborn foal for identification. To confirm the pedigree, an accreditation certificate is issued after identifying the relationship between the parent horses and the foal using paternity tests recommended by the International Society of Animal Genetics. The pedigree-related information on Jeju horses is offered via the Jeju Horse Database System.
