= Geonip-dong =

- Dong
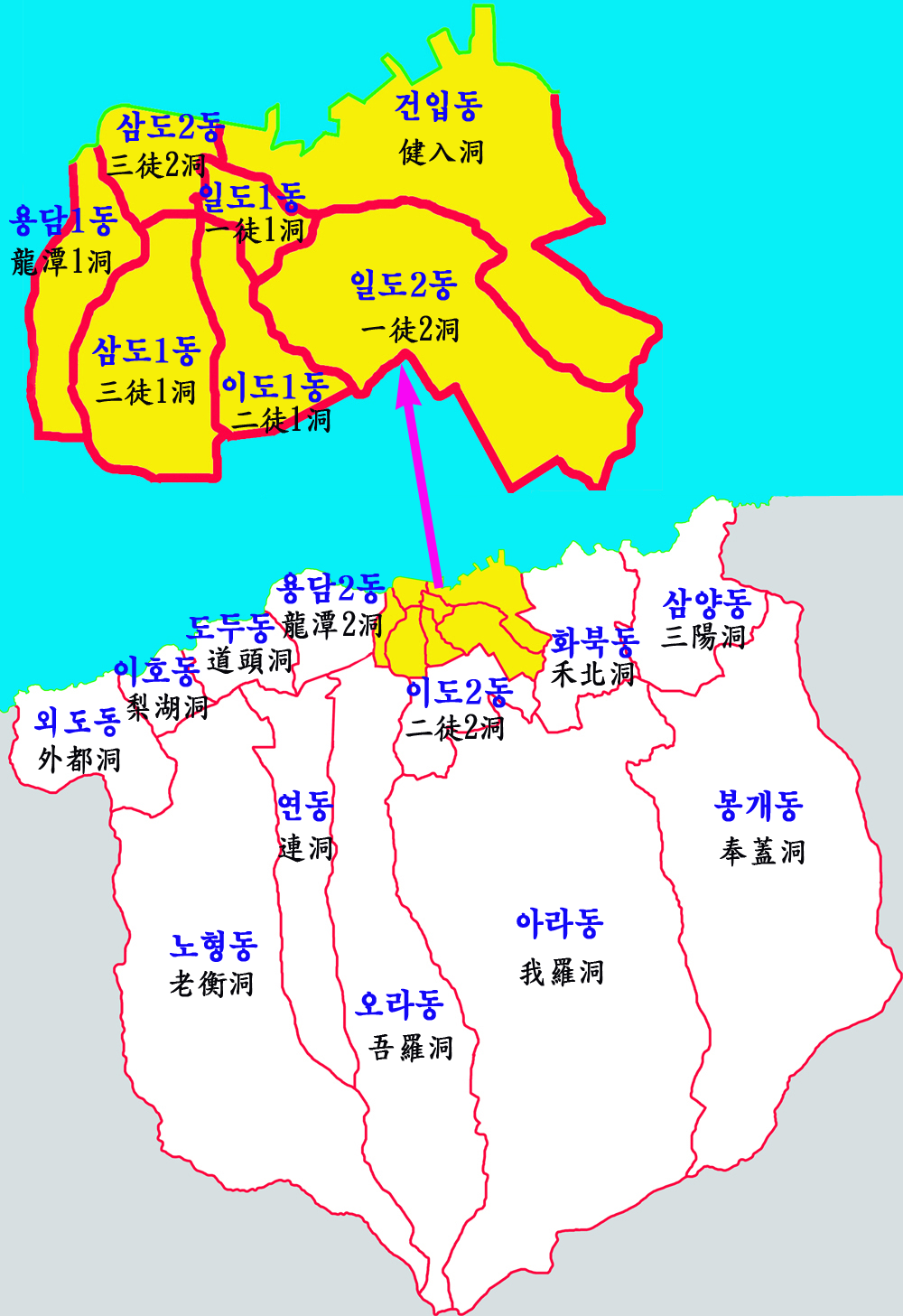

- Location within South Korea
- Coordinates: 33°25′55.13″N 126°23′19.54″E
- Country: South Korea

Area
  - Total: 2.53 km^{2} (0.98 sq mi)

Population (2022 December)
  - Total: 8,866
  - Density: 3,500/km^{2} (9,080/sq mi)
- Dialect: Jeju

Korean name
- Hangul: 건입동
- Hanja: 健入洞
- RR: Geonip-dong
- MR: Kŏnip-tong

Geonip-dong (Korean: 건입동) is a neighbourhood in Jeju City, South Korea.

== Etymology ==
The origin of the name is unclear, but there are various theories. One source dates it back to Silla, saying the name geonip was created as a reference to the members of the Go family of Jeju entering Jeju from Silla.

== History ==
Geonip first started as Geonip district in 1914. Geonip-dong was incorporated into Jeju City in 1955 and became a dong.The neighborhood originally started as a fishing town, but was commercialized asa result of opening of the nearby Port of Jeju

== Geography ==
Geonip-dong is commonly referred to as a mountainous area because it is a village centered on the Sanjicheon in the west, and it is a rare example of several neighborhoods centered on 'Goeunimor(고으니모르)', which is the border point with Hwabuk, to the east, forming a single natural village and forming a legal-status neighborhood. It is divided into 20 Tongs and 113 bans.

== Attractions ==
The neighborhood hosts the museum of Gim Man-deok(built in 1978), the Sarabong mountain and the Mochungsa shrine. It also has the Jeju National Museum. In 2023, the April 3rd incident history museum opened in the town's old alcohol factory site that was formerly used as a concentration camp for the victims.
