= Yaimamaru =

Japanese passenger ship built in 1997

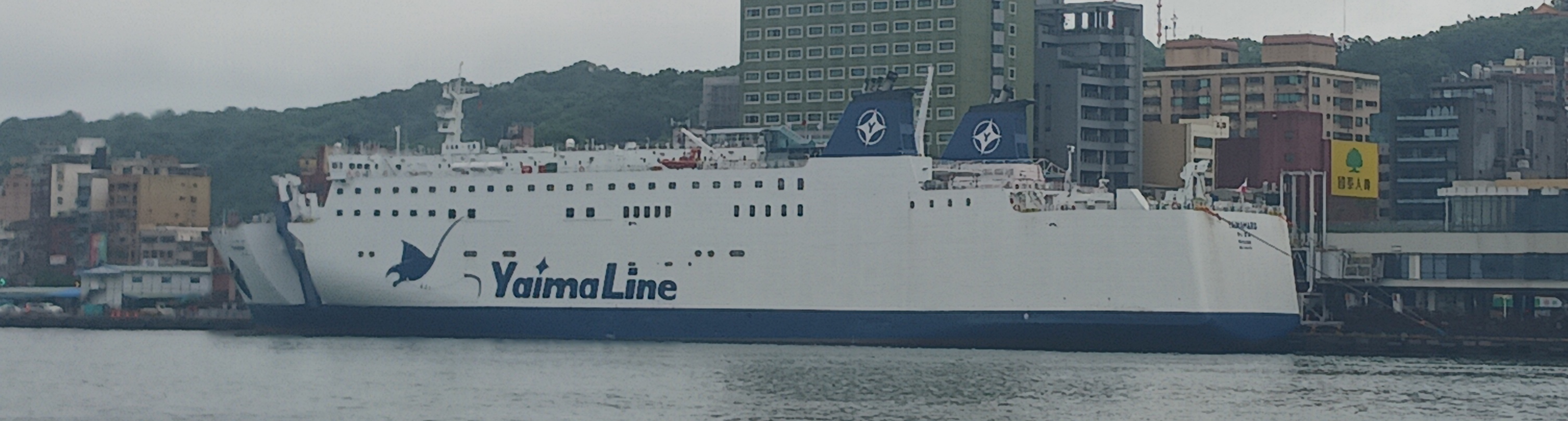
- Yaimamaru in 2026

History

Japan
- Name: Sunflower Kuroshio; (さんふらわあ くろしお)
- Namesake: Kuroshio current
- Port of registry: Tokyo
- Builder: MHI Shipbuilding Shimonoseki shipyard
- Yard number: 1034
- Launched: 21 March 1997
- In service: 18 June 1997
- Home port: Tokyo
- Identification: Call sign: JG5502; IMO number: 9162150; MMSI number: 441178000

South Korea
- Name: Panstar Dream; (팬스타 드림); (パンスター・ドリーム)
- Namesake: Dream
- Operator: Panstar Line Dot Com Ltd (PanStar Cruise)
- Port of registry: Jeju
- Acquired: 2002
- In service: 2002–2025
- Home port: Busan
- Identification: Call sign: DSFU2; IMO number: 9162150; MMSI number: 441178000

Panama
- Name: Yaimamaru; (やいま丸)
- Namesake: Yaima (Yaeyama Islands)
- Owner: Shosen Yaima Panama SA
- Operator: Shosen Yaima Co Ltd (YaimaLine)
- Port of registry: Panama
- Acquired: August 2025
- In service: December 2025 (scheduled)
- Identification: Call sign: 3E8917; IMO number: 9162150; MMSI number: 352005704

General characteristics
- Tonnage: 3,738 DWT; 21,688 GT
- Length: 160 m (524 ft 11 in) LOA
- Beam: 25.0 m (82 ft 0 in)
- Draft: 4.49 m (14 ft 9 in); 6.05 m (19 ft 10 in) full load
- Installed power: 27,000 hp (20 MW)
- Propulsion: 2 × Pielstick-Nippon NKK18PC-6V 27,000 hp (20 MW)
- Speed: 22.7 knots (42.0 km/h; 26.1 mph)
- Capacity: 560
- Crew: 40

The Yaimamaru is a Japanese roll-on/roll-off passenger ship launched in 1997 at Mitsubishi Heavy Industries Shipbuilding Shimonoseki shipyard for the Blue Highway Line (currently MOL Sunflower). She sailed under the Japanese flag as the Sunflower Kuroshio until 2001. The South Korean shipping company PanStar Cruise acquired her in 2002, and she began operating on the Busan–Osaka route as the PanStar Dream until a newer ship took her place. Since August 2025, she has been sailing under the Panamanian flag and is set to serve the Ishigaki–Keelung route by the Japanese shipping company YaimaLine.

== Design and construction ==
The Sunflower Kuroshio, built to replace the Sunflower Tosa, was constructed in yard number 1034 in Shimonoseki and launched in March 1997. She was named after the Kuroshio Current, which flows through the Pacific Ocean along her intended service route. The design concept of the vessel is a "leisurely cruise in yukata" (浴衣でくつろぐ船の旅), featuring interior décor inspired by traditional Japanese inns. Passengers can enjoy wearing yukata while relaxing in the ship's communal areas.

== Service history ==
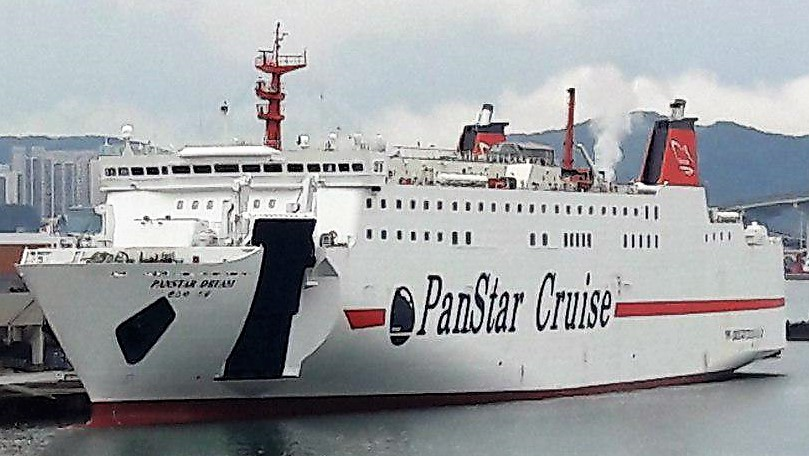
Panstar Dream, photographed in 2018

The Sunflower Kuroshio began ferry service connecting Tokyo, Nachikatsuura, and Kōchi, after her delivery in June 1997. Revenues dropped significantly after passenger capacity fell sharply from around 1,100 under her predecessor. This was further impacted by upgrades to the road network, including National Route 42; the growth of air travel, with large passenger planes flying into Nanki-Shirahama Airport; and a decrease in freight transport due to weak timber demand after the rise of prefabricated materials. Consequently, annual deficits grew to 400–600 million yen, and accumulated losses exceeded 4 billion yen. As a result, the route ended scheduled service in October 2001. Later, the Sunflower Kuroshio stepped in as a substitute vessel after the Star Diamond, operated by Diamond Ferry, had to suspend operations due to engine failure. From October to December 2001, she served on the Kobe–Beppu route as part of Diamond Ferry's fleet.

In May 2002, she was acquired and renamed Panstar Dream by the South Korean shipping company PanStar Cruise, based in Jeju City. Panstar Dream then went through a rebuild, increasing her gross tonnage significantly from 9,723 to 21,535 GT. She began operating on the Busan–Osaka route later that same year, running three times per week.

In October 2023, PanStar announced plans for a new ship that would begin service on the Busan–Osaka route in February 2025, replacing the Panstar Dream. Meanwhile, the city of Ishigaki, struck by the COVID-19 pandemic, considered launching regular ferry services to Taiwan to boost its tourism economy and strengthen disaster resilience. The city first suggested using the high-speed catamaran Natchan Rera, which had run the Ishigaki–Hualien route before, but she was sold to a Greek shipping company in January 2024. The city mentioned they were seeking other options but insisted that the route plan would stay on schedule. In August 2024, officials announced plans to acquire the retiring Panstar Dream and launch new services in 2025 between Ishigaki and Keelung. In September, the city announced the launch of a new entity, YaimaLine, backed by local businesses and partnering with Taiwan's Wagon Group shipping agency, to run the scheduled service.

YaimaLine launched its official website in mid-2025 and announced that its ferry service would begin in September, offering three trips per week. The website also revealed that the newly acquired ship would be renamed Yaimamaru (やいま丸). In June 2025, PanStar transferred the Panstar Dream to YaimaLine, and she underwent a two-month overhaul. She subsequently sailed under the Panamanian flag as the Yaimamaru, departing from Busan and arriving in Keelung on 9 August 2025. The Port of Keelung confirmed that the ship submitted its application to begin service in mid-September on that same day. Nevertheless, Wagon Group later announced that the service would be postponed until the end of October due to additional inspections and technical work. During the regular session of the Ishigaki City Council on 16 September, officials told councillors that the departure date for the Yaimamaru was still uncertain, due to ongoing inspections and modifications, but insisted that efforts were being made to start operations as soon as possible. The maiden voyage of the route was postponed twice for additional work. Wagon Group submitted an application to the Taiwanese port authority in late November, expecting the route to be operational by the end of the year.

Renovations and administrative delays pushed the launch further to January 2026, but by March, the service still hadn't started. At a regular Ishigaki City Council meeting the same month, both ruling and opposition members voiced concerns about the timing. Mayor Nakayama, however, expressed confidence that operations would kick off in April. The ferry service srtated on 28 May 2026. Mayor Nakayama expected the route to serve as a bridge that "supports tourism, logistics, economic activity, cultural exchange and education". The boat trip takes eight hours.
