= Frederic H. Dustin =

American academic in South Korea (1930–2018)

Frederic H Dustin
- Born: January 12, 1930; Bellingham, Washington, U.S.
- Died: May 5, 2018 (aged 88); Jeju City, South Korea
- Occupations: Businessman, Jeju Kimnyoung Maze Park

Frederic H. Dustin, PhD (January 12, 1930 – May 5, 2018) was an American professor, author, businessman and philanthropist. He was the creator and owner of the Gimnyeong Maze Park on Jeju Island, South Korea. Dr. Dustin, a professor at Jeju National University, was an honorary citizen of the Jeju Self-governing Province. He was also reportedly the longest independently living foreigner in Korea and continued to maintain his U.S. citizenship.

== Personal life ==
Frederic H. Dustin was born on January 12, 1930, in Bellingham at St. Luke's Hospital to Fred H Dustin and Mayme Hall. He died on May 5, 2018, on Jeju Island in Korea. He lived in Korea since 1958 and on Jeju since 1971. He was married in 1971 to Marie-Louise Gebhardt, a Lutheran missionary. She died in 1973 after contracting cancer.

== Education ==
His original academic interest was Native Americans but he later focused on traditional Korean culture. Dustin is the first American to receive a Master's in Korean Language and Literature. His Master's thesis was entitled An Aspect of Korean Contemporary Literature with Special Reference to Bulggot (a Korean novel).

He entered the University of Washington in September 1948 and attended until June 1949. He then entered Western Washington University from September 1949 until June 1951. Two years later, he re-entered Western Washington State University in July 1953 and graduated the following year, on June 11, 1954, with a bachelor's degree in education.

Dustin later attended the University of Michigan in July and August 1955. There, he entered the University of Washington Graduate School in September 1957. He graduated on December 19, 1958, with the first Master of Arts Degree in Korean language and literature in the U.S.

== Military career ==
Dustin joined the Reserve Officers' Training Corps (ROTC) in his first year of college. He was drafted in September 1951, during the Korean War, and spent December and January in the Band Training Unit at Camp Roberts in Fort Ord, California. He went home before going to Camp Stoneman.

Dustin first came to Korea as a bandsman, a clarinetist in the 7th Division Band. He was honorably discharged and returned to Washington in May 1953. He began working for the 19th Battalion, 8th Regiment, 7th Division, in November 1968 as a supply officer, grade GS-9. He finished working for the 19th Battalion in February 1971.

== Teaching career ==
Dustin began teaching at Yonhi University (연희대학교) in Seoul on September 11, 1955, as a lecturer in English, his position funded by The Asia Foundation. He was actively associated with the introduction of basketball into the Republic of Korea through the formation of the Yonhi University team during this period. He finished teaching at Yonhi University in August 1957.

After returning to America to study for his M.A Degree, Dustin returned to South Korea and began teaching at Chung-Ang University (중아대학교) in Seoul on September 30, 1958, again as a lecturer in English. In addition to his regular academic duties as an English instructor, he initiated sculling activities in the nearby Han River by assisting the school to obtain two sculling boats from the University of Washington. He instructed and supervised the sculling team and supervised hiking and mountain climbing trips of groups of students. He finished teaching at Chung-Ang University in February 1960.

Dustin first started teaching at Jeju National University (제주대학교) in September 1971. He began his career there as a Full-time Lecturer in English in the Department of Tourism Management. At that time, it never entered his mind that he'd work there for 23 years and retire as a full professor. During this period of teaching, he accompanied the school soccer team to the national soccer games in Daegu in 1976, as an advisor. He finished teaching at CNU in February 1979 to return to Seoul.

Back in the capitol, Dustin took up three positions teaching English, beginning in March 1979. He was a visiting professor at Sejong University (세종대학교), where he also served as a technical advisor to the student sailing club. He taught at Hongik University (홍익대학교) as a visiting professor (객원교수) and was also a lecturer in English at the Korea Institute of Finance (한국금융연구원). He finished his work in Seoul in 1981 as he was invited to return to Jeju National University, where he began teaching again in March 1982.

Dustin returned to CNU as a Full Associate Professor and did research in and taught tourism development policies in addition to his regular English courses in the Tourism Management Department. He represented Jeju's tourism industry interests in four international seminars on tourism development, as a main speaker. He assisted in the development of, and acted as technical advisor, to the university's sailing club. In addition, he served as an advisor to the provincial government, acting as a VIP Orientation Guide.

Dustin was a staff teacher for the University of Maryland's Far East department and he appeared weekly on an educational television program in 1986 and 1987. He finished teaching at Jeju National University on December 31, 1994, after 23 years. His classes are fondly remembered by a great number of Jeju residents, as well as the frequent social gatherings at his home in the forest outside of Kimnyoung Village.

== Business career ==
Dustin began working at the Korean Consolidated Mining Company, Ltd. (KCMC, 한국합자광업), in January 1960, as a technical advisor and superintendent to help establish the Tongsan Mine. He worked in the remote village of Baewawi for two years until the spring of 1962 when an accidental chemical splash to his eyes forced him to consider other work. He finished working for the KCMC in December 1962 and moved to Seoul.

He began working for the Korea Republic Newspaper (한국일보) in February 1962 as a copy reader. He finished working there in February 1963. He then began working as a field auditor for The Church International Field Service in March 1963. He finished working for the organization in October 1963. He began working at Kanaan Poultry Corporation (가나안양계주식회사) in September 1964. He was the Representative and managing director. He finished working there in July 1968.

== Philanthropy ==
Under a grant from the Asia Foundation, Dr. Dustin prepared the first guidebook on Jeju, published as "An Introduction to Cheju Island" in 1978.

During his tenure at Jeju National University, Dustin reported gave away 80% of his earnings every year to $2support foreign faculty members and improve the quality of education at the university where he taught for 23 years. The money is divided roughly evenly between a "life-education" program for marine leisure sports activities and the university's development fund to pay for foreign professors' salaries.

Awards and Public Recognition
Title	Date
Plaque of Appreciation from Police Bureau (경찰국장감사패)	October 1976
Plaque of Appreciation from Minister of Tourism, South Korea (한국관광공사감사패)	February 28, 1982
Memorial Plaque from the Jeju Rotary Club (제주로타리클럽기념패)	February 18, 1987
Memorial Plaque from Cheju National University (제주대학교기녑패)	January 12, 1990
Plaque of Appreciation from Cheju National University (제주대학교감사패)	December 16, 1994
Plaque of Recognition of Meritorious Deeds from Cheju National University (제주대학교공로패)	December 16, 1994
Honorary Doctoral Degree from Cheju National University	Unknown
Selected by the Governor of Jeju Province to represent the foreign community	2006
Park Sun Ho Plaque of Appreciation from the Korea Yacht Association	2008
