= Jeju Baseball Stadium =

Stadium in Jeju Province, South Korea

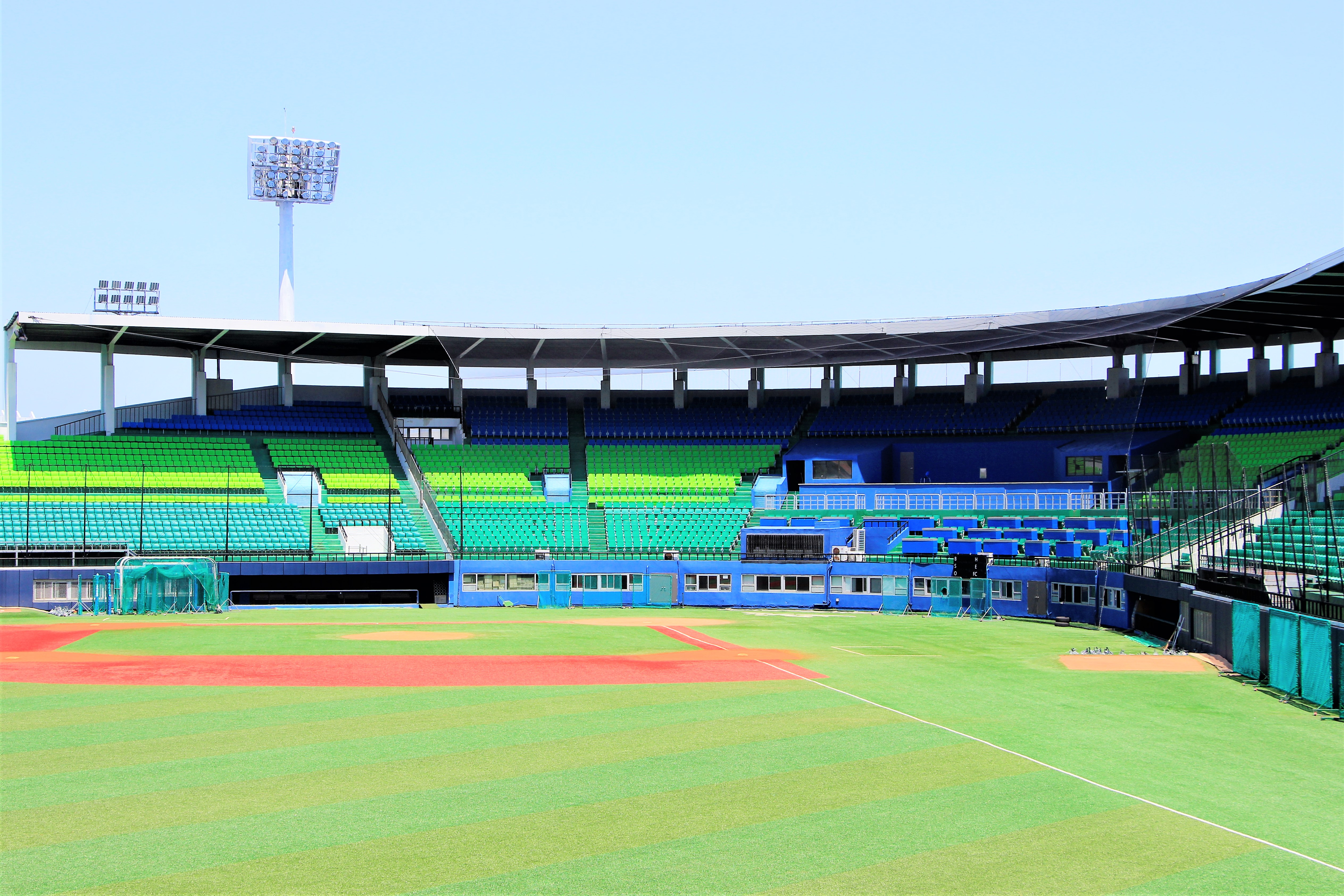
- Interactive map of Jeju Baseball Stadium
- Location: Jeju City, South Korea
- Coordinates: 33.495728°N 126.514378°E
- Owner: Jeju, South Korea
- Operator: Nexen Heroes
- Capacity: 8,500
- Surface: Grass
- Field size: Left field: 100 metres (330 ft); Center Field: 123 metres (404 ft); Right field: 100 metres (330 ft)

Construction
- Opened: 1984

Tenant
- Nexen Heroes (KBO) 2008

Jeju Baseball Stadium (Korean: 제주오라종합경기장 야구장) is a baseball stadium in Jeju City, Jeju, South Korea. It is used mostly for amateur baseball games and is the second home stadium of Nexen Heroes.

== See also ==
- List of baseball stadiums in South Korea
