= Samseonghyeol =

Prehistoric site on Jeju Island, South Korea

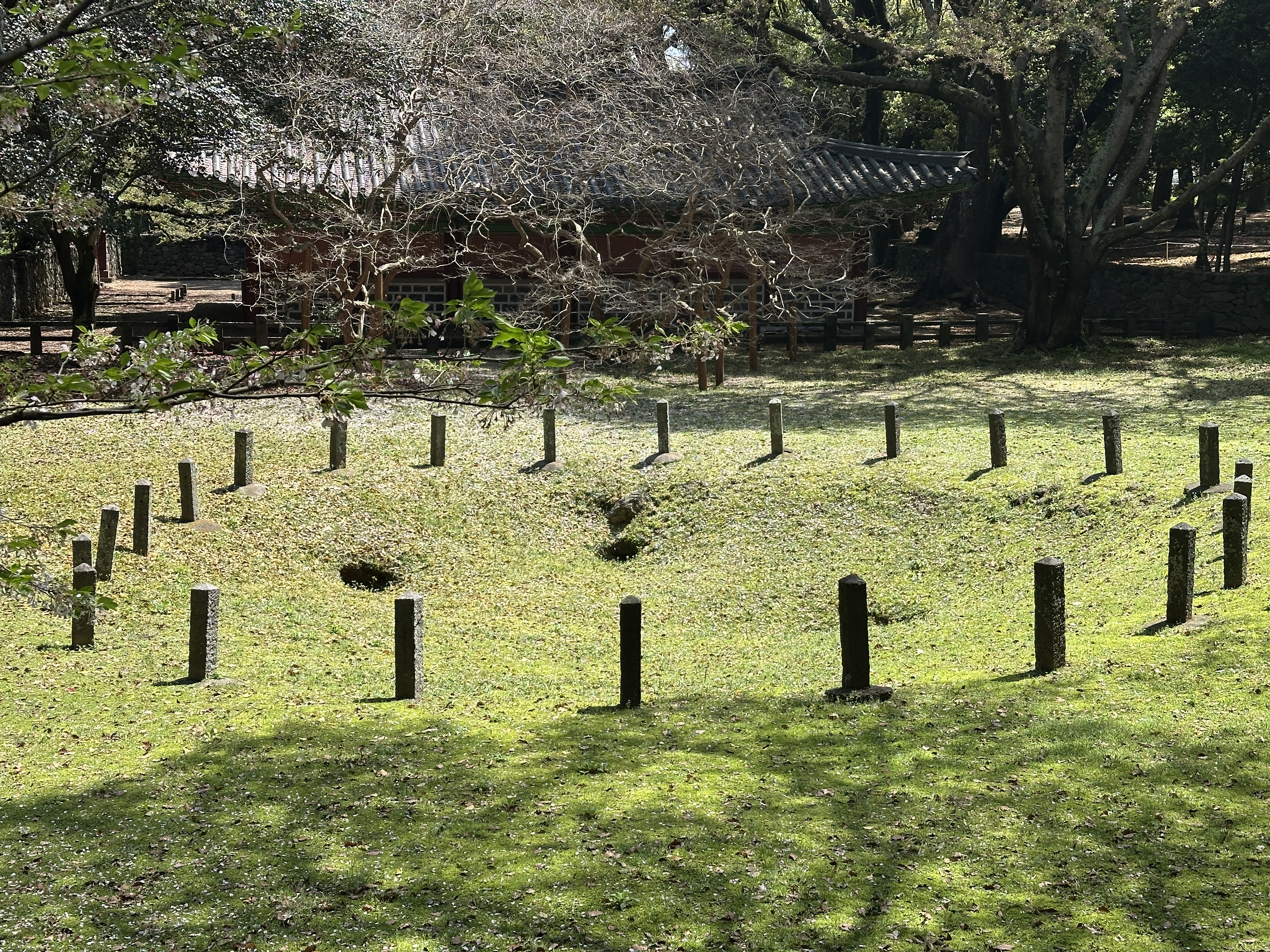
- The three depressions in the ground (2026)
- Interactive map of Samseonghyeol
- Coordinates: 33.5047°N 126.5293°E

Historic Sites of South Korea
- Official name: Samseonghyeol Shrine, Jeju
- Designated: June 10, 1964
- Reference no.: 134

Korean name
- Hangul: 삼성혈
- Hanja: 三姓穴
- RR: Samseonghyeol
- MR: Samsŏnghyŏl

The Samseonghyeol (Korean: 삼성혈; Hanja: 三姓穴; lit. 'three clans' holes') is an archeological, historical, and cultural landmark in Jeju City, Jeju Province, South Korea.

It is associated with a Jeju founding legend. It is believed that three demigods emerged from the holes in the ground on this site, and became the first people of the island.

== Information ==
The site is located in the city center of Jeju City and consists mainly of a shrine and a depression from which, according to legend, three demigods emerged from the ground to become the founding fathers of the ancient kingdom of Tamna and its people. Three families (or clans) bear the name and claim descendance from those deities.

- Go Eulna (고을나; 高乙那; Ko Ŭlla)
- Yang Eulna (양을나; 良乙那; Yang Ŭlla)
- Bu Eulna (부을나; 夫乙那; Pu Ŭlla)

== Legend of the Eulna ==
The myth states that in the beginning, there were no people in Tamna. According to old records (Goryeosa, Yeongjuji), there first was a strangely outstanding mountain called Hallasan. The clouds and the sea were clearly visible far above and below, and Hallasan, the main mountain, cast out three gods at a place called 'Moheung' at the northern foot of the island. This was about 4,300 years ago, and the place is now called Samseonghyeol because of the Samsinin (삼신인; 三神人) that came out (湧出). These deities were called Eulna. They were the founders of the three surnames, and they founded the kingdom of Tamna.

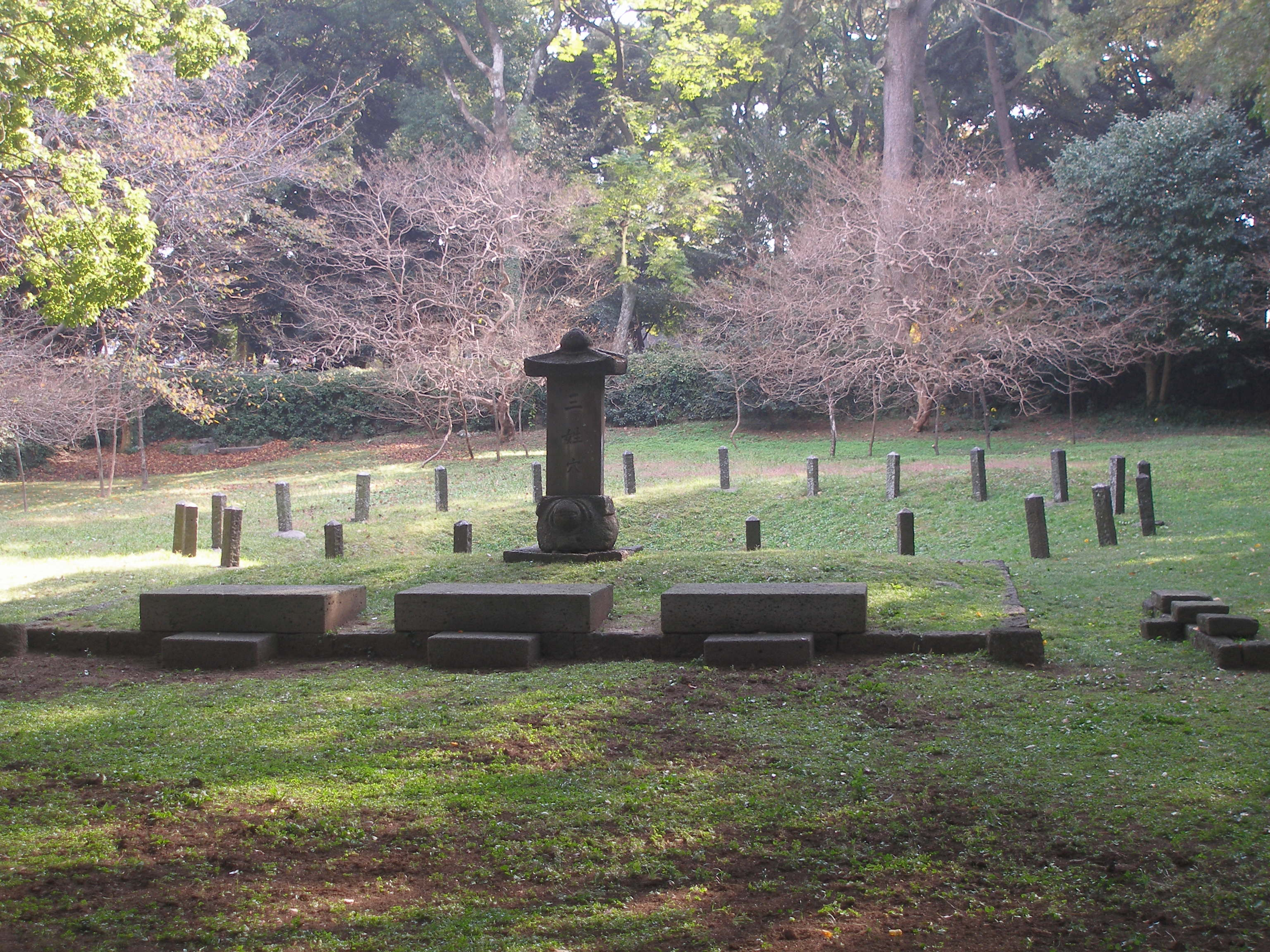
The shrine

The deities' shapes were very tall and large, giving them the appearance of immortals not found in human society. These three gods wore leather clothes and lived a primitive hunting life. One day, they climbed Hallasan and looked at the far eastern sea, where they saw a wooden box sealed with purple soil coming up along with the waves. Following the wooden chest, they arrived at the seashore of Onpyeong-ri, Seongsan-eup, and opened the wooden chest. There was a round jade box the shape of an egg inside, and a messenger wearing a purple robe.

When the deities opened the jade box, three virgins, elegantly dressed in blue clothes with beautiful purple hues came out. They sat down together and brought cattle and five-grain seeds out on the coastal hill of Yeonhonpo.

Accordingly, the three gods carefully prepared offerings, performed rites, and announced to the heavens that they would marry each of the three princesses. They set up a bridal chamber in a cave next to the pond, and lived from then on as human beings.
