= Kimnyoung Maze Park =

Hedge maze on Jeju Island, South Korea

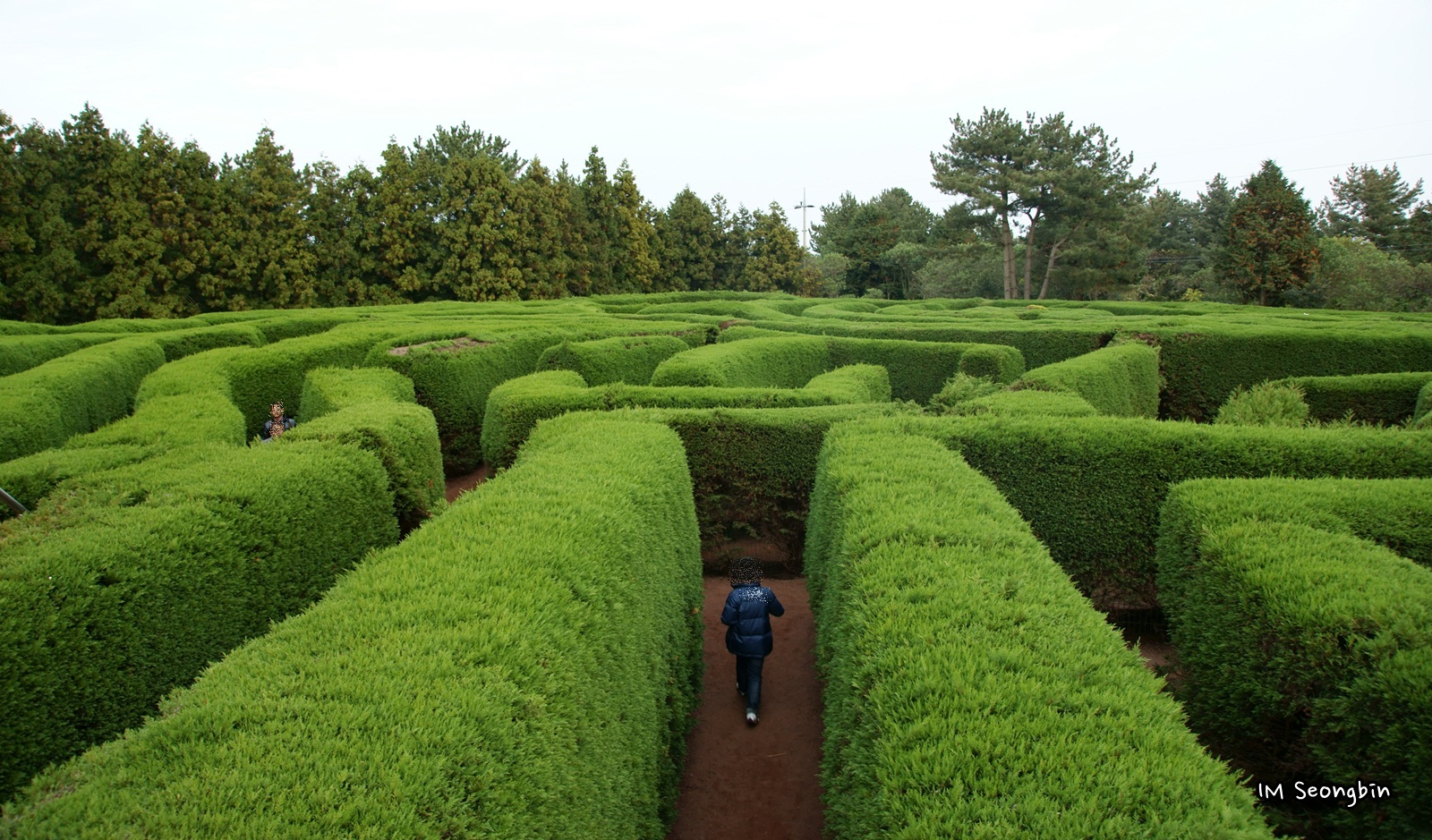
- Interactive map of Kimnyoung Maze Park
- Location: 122, Manjanggul-gil, Jeju-si, Jeju-do
- Coordinates: 33.536°N 126.772°E
- Status: Operating
- Opened: 1987
- Theme: Hedge maze
- Website: www.jejumaze.com

Kimnyoung Maze Park (Korean: 김녕미로공원), sometimes Gimnyeong Maze Park, Kimnyeong Maze Park, or Kimnyong Maze Park, is a hedge maze located in Jeju City, Jeju Province, South Korea. It is located in between the major tourist destinations of Manjanggul and Gimnyeongsagul.

Its construction was funded by Frederic H. Dustin (1930–2018), an American professor at Jeju National University. It was designed by the company Adrian Fisher Minotaur Maze Designs, and opened in 1987 as the first maze park in South Korea. The maze contains a number of symbols that represent the history and culture of Jeju. Dustin was fond of cats, and curated a population of them that now roams around the maze. The population is cared for and provided food, medication, and attention.
