= Yakcheonsa =

Buddhist temple on Jeju Island, South Korea

- 약천사
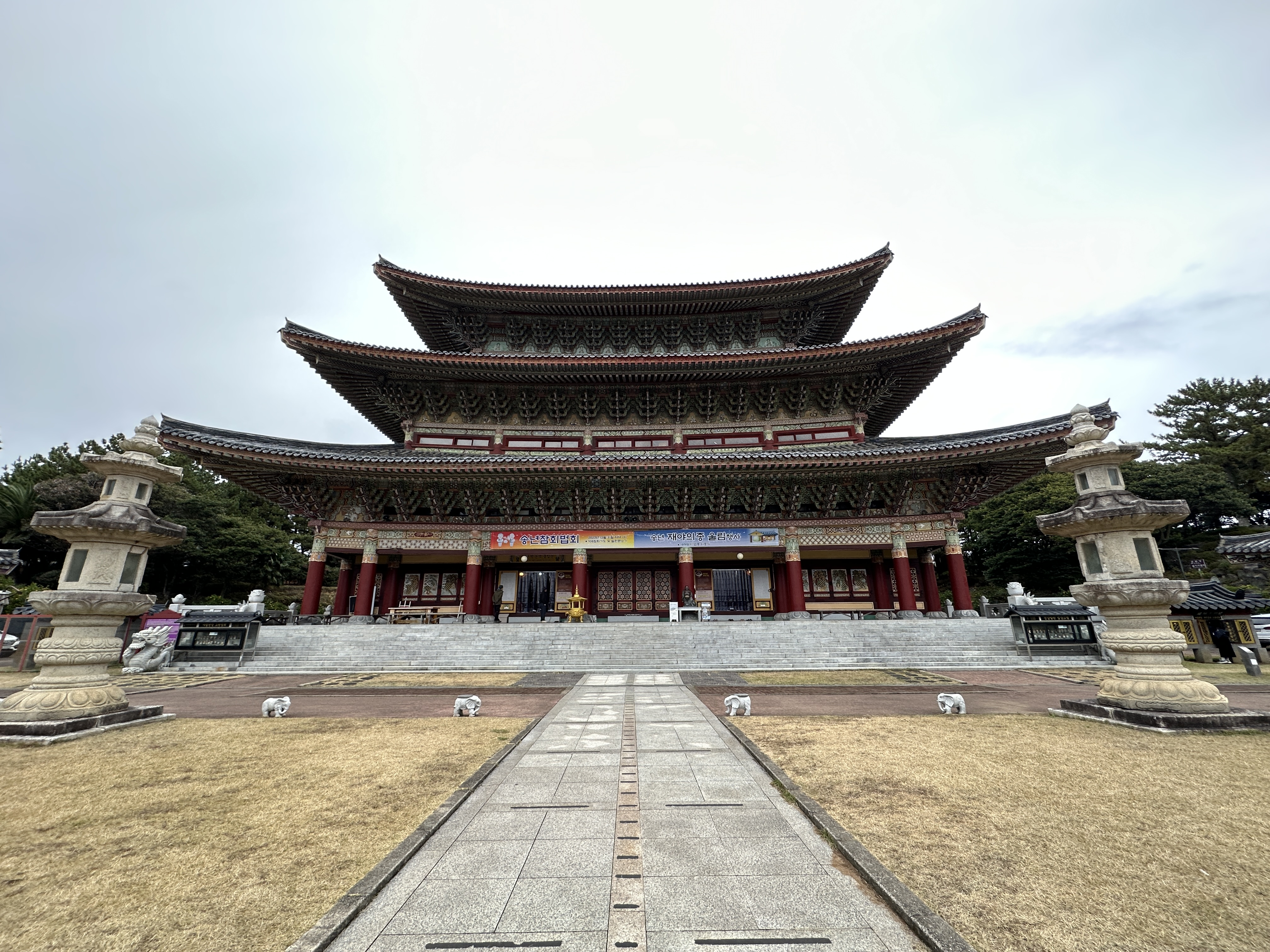
- The main temple building (2023)

- Location within South Korea

Religion
- Affiliation: Jogye Order of Korean Buddhism

Location
- Location: 293-28 Ieodo-ro, Seogwipo, Jeju Province, South Korea
- Coordinates: 33°14′43.2″N 126°26′58.8″E

Yakcheonsa (Korean: 약천사; Hanja: 藥泉寺; lit. 'medicine spring temple') is a Buddhist temple of the Jogye Order in Seogwipo, Jeju Province, South Korea.

== History ==
The area the temple is now located at has a mineral water spring called in the Jeju language Dwaeksaemi (돽새미). The spring was also called Doyaksaem (도약샘; 道藥泉), in reference to its supposed healing properties; this eventually inspired the name of Yakcheonsa.

Around 1960, a monk named Kim Pyeong-gon (김평곤) prayed in a natural cave near the eventual site of the temple. While praying, he had a revelation and built a small thatched roof temple nearby. In 1981, a Buddhist monk named Hyein (혜인) decided to build a more permanent temple in the area, and construction began in 1988. Construction concluded in 1996; at which point they claimed the building was the single largest Buddhist temple in East Asia.

Each year on March 15 of the Korean calendar, a senior citizen's event is held. A singing competition is held in the event.

In March 1999, the temple began offering cultural experiences and tea ceremony classes. In 2005, a charity group was founded at the temple. The temple also participates in the creation of traditional Korean paper, called hanji.

== Architecture ==
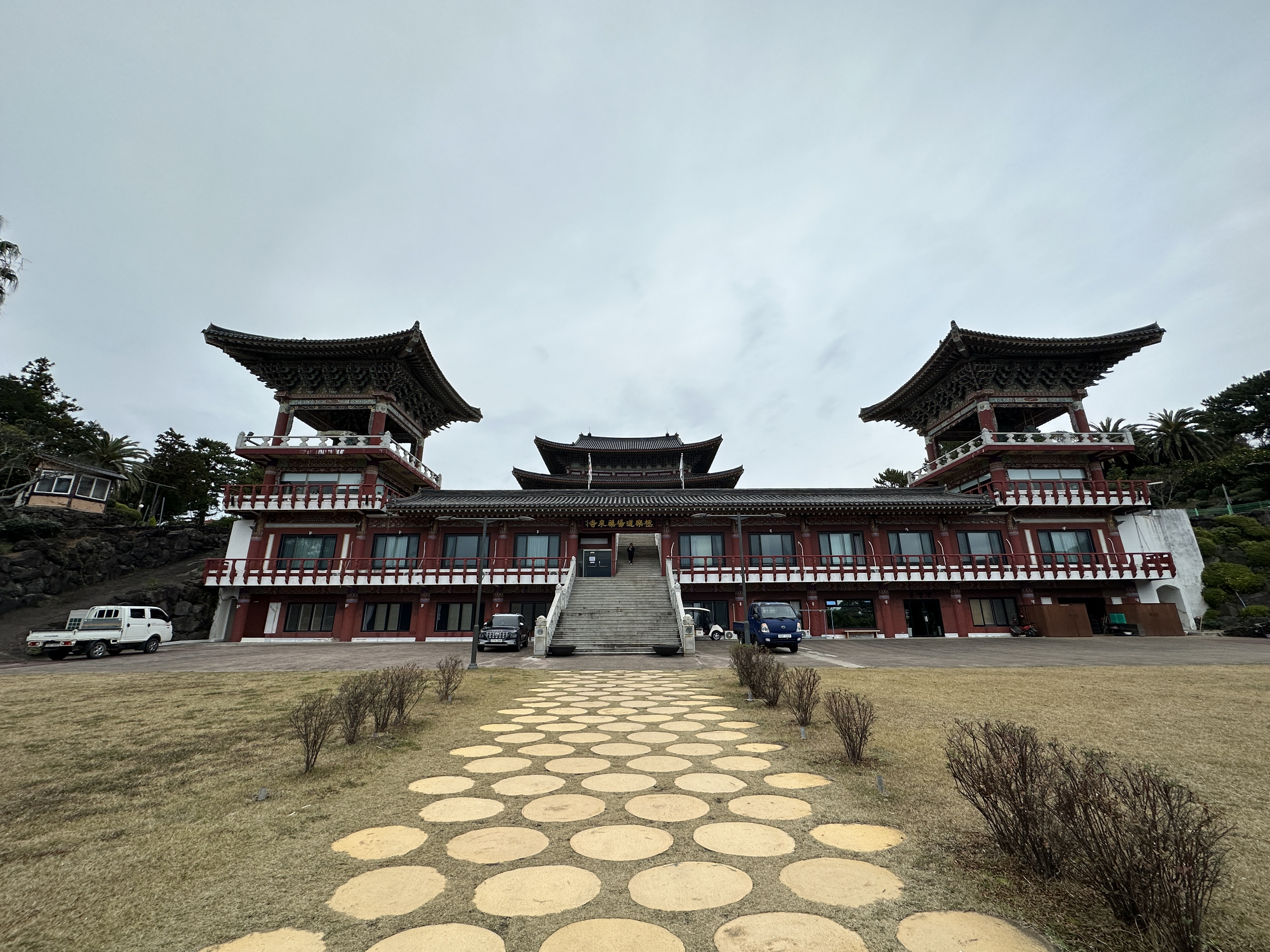
Other facilities of the temple in front of the main building (2023)

The main building Daejeokgwangjeon has three stories above ground and one below. It is 29.5 m (97 ft) tall from the ground, and has a floor area of 1,023 pyeong (3,380 m^{2}). Inside is a large wooden Buddha statue, which is claimed to be the largest wooden statue of Buddha in South Korea. The wood used to make the statue is sourced from Paektu Mountain. On the second floor are 80,000 gilt-bronze Buddha statues, and on the third are numerous lanterns.

There are a number of other buildings in the complex, many of which are connected by above and underground passageways. Nearby is a three-story bell pavilion, and a dormitory for monks. There is also an office building for managing the affairs of the temple.

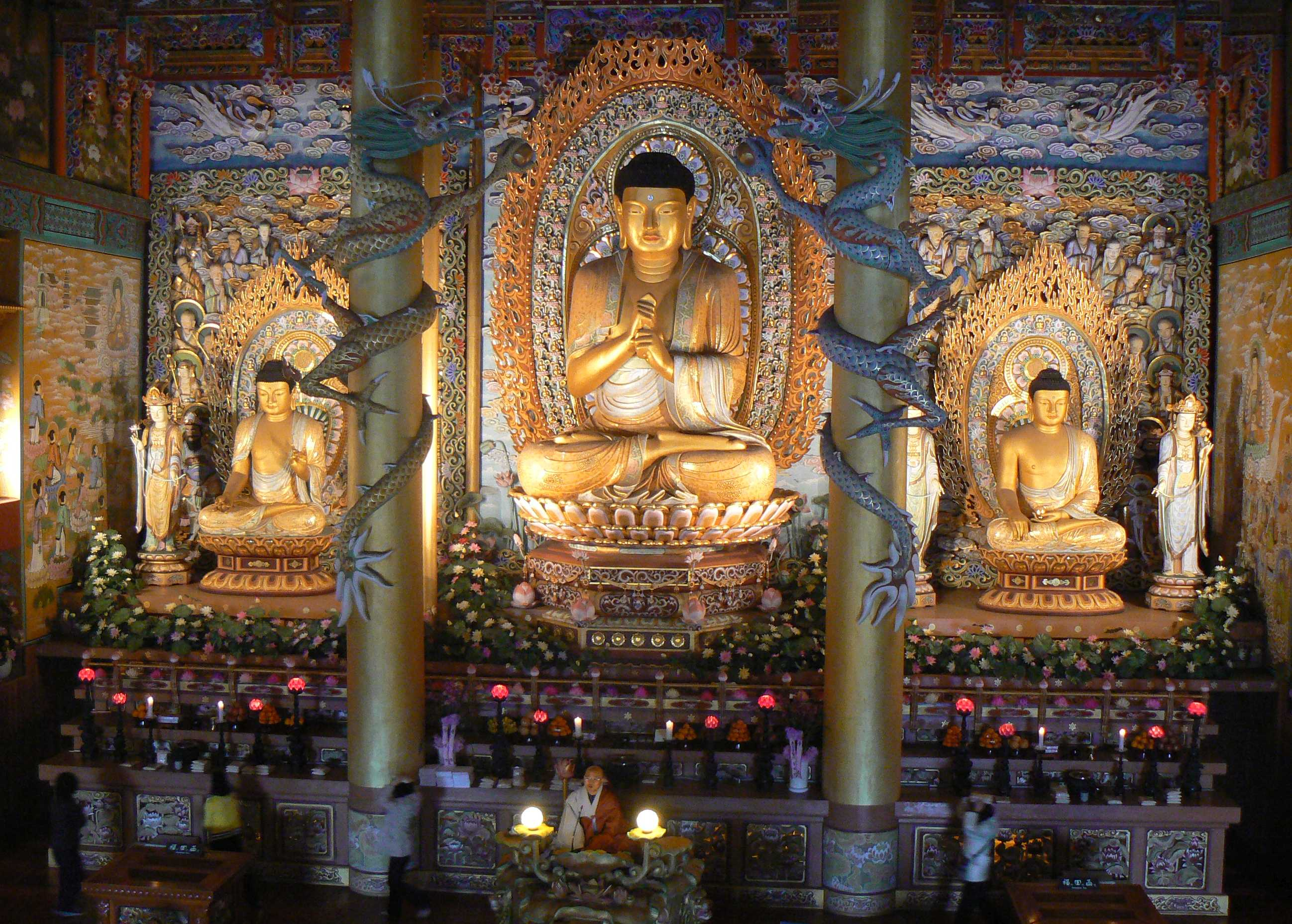
The main Buddha statues in the main temple building (2009)

Similar to other Buddhist temples in South Korea, Yakcheonsa has facilities for lay brethren to stay, eat, and meditate, in addition to participating in Buddhist rituals.

== Tourism ==
Since January 9, 2006, the temple has participated in the Templestay program, in which visitors can participate in Buddhist cultural programs at the temple.

== Gallery ==
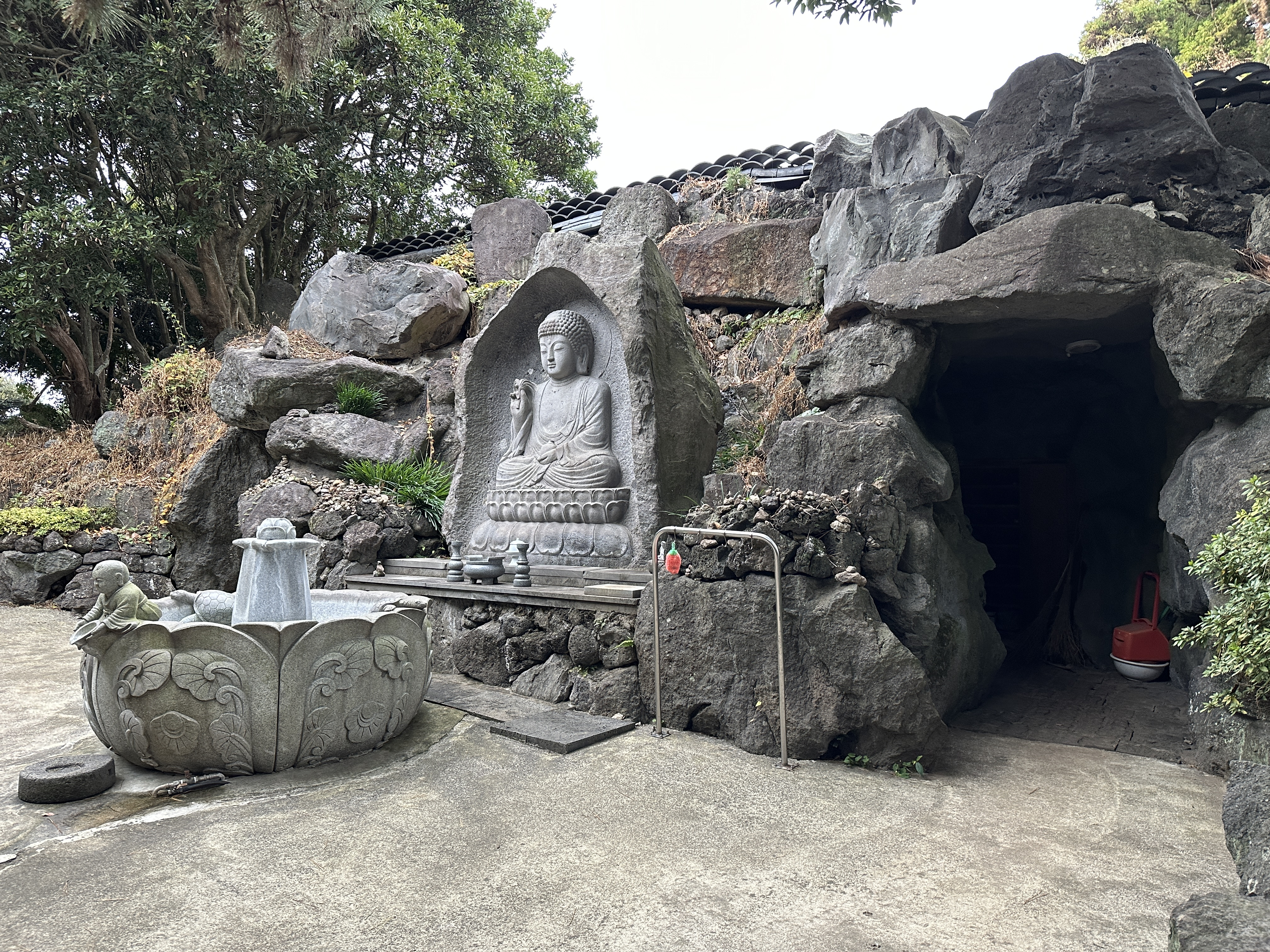
A small cave temple just behind the main building (2023)

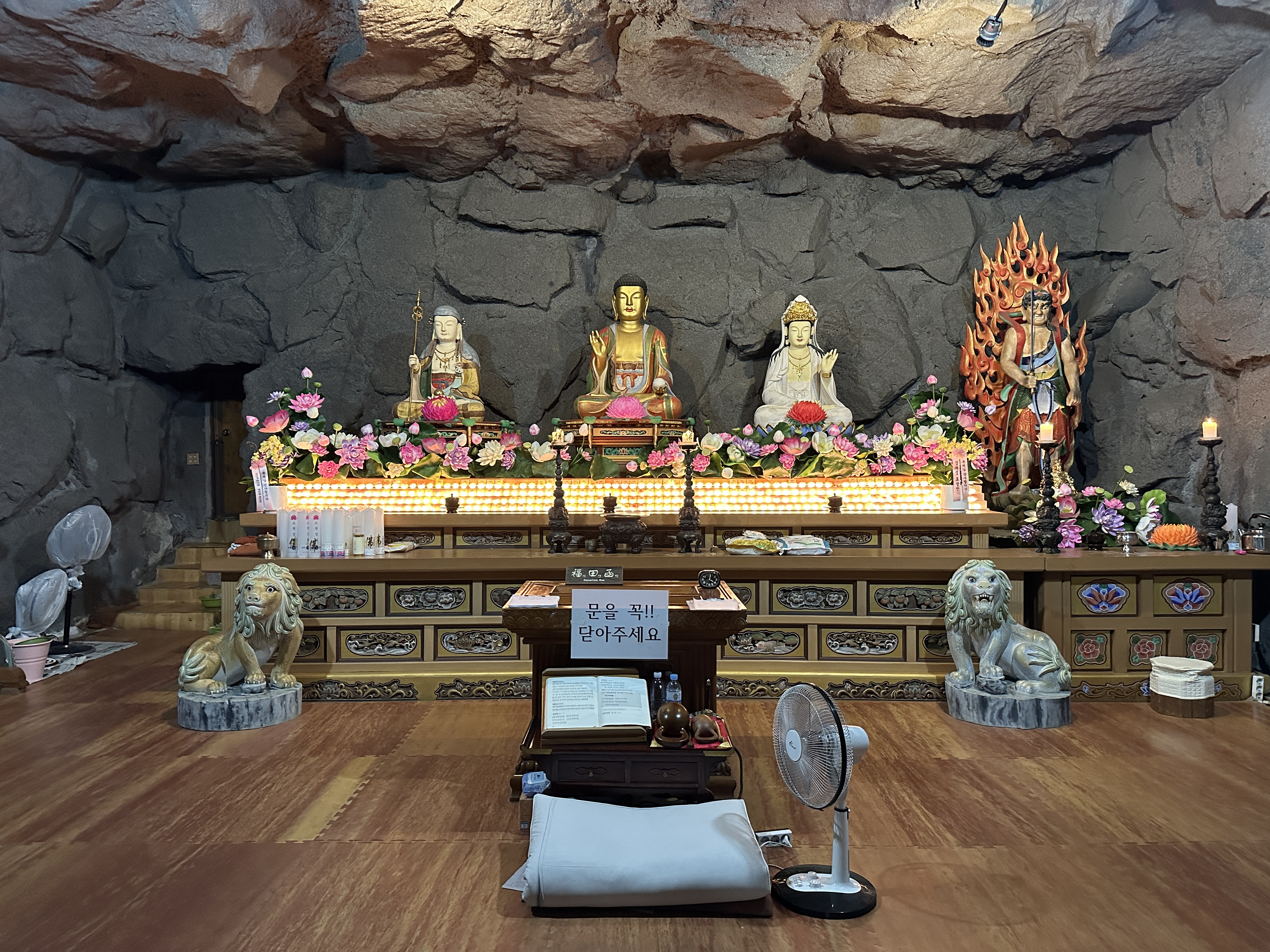
Inside of the cave temple (2023)

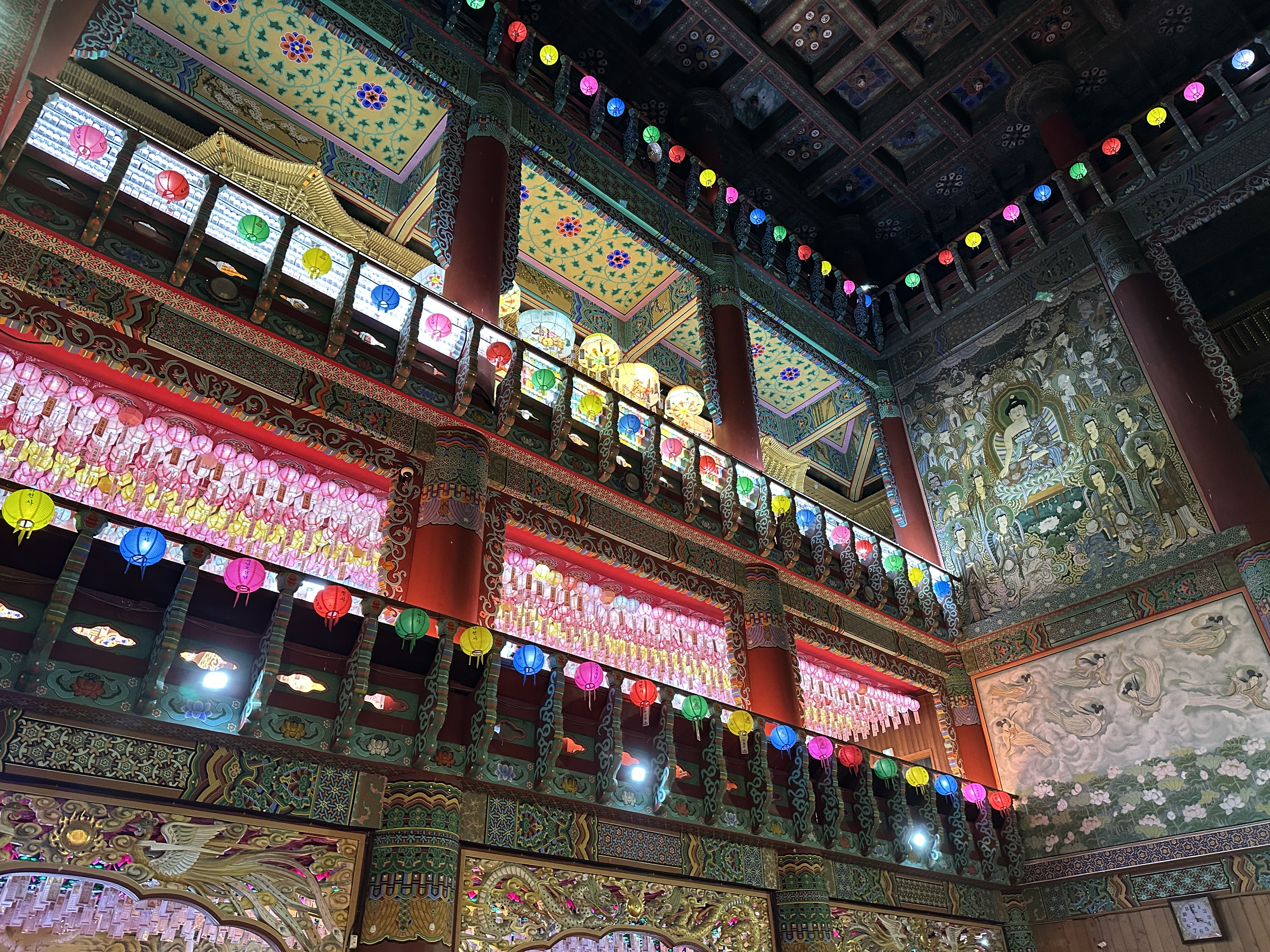
The second and third floors of the main temple, as well as the ceiling and walls, viewed from the first floor (2023)
