= Jeju City =

City in Jeju, South Korea

Jeju
- Administrative city
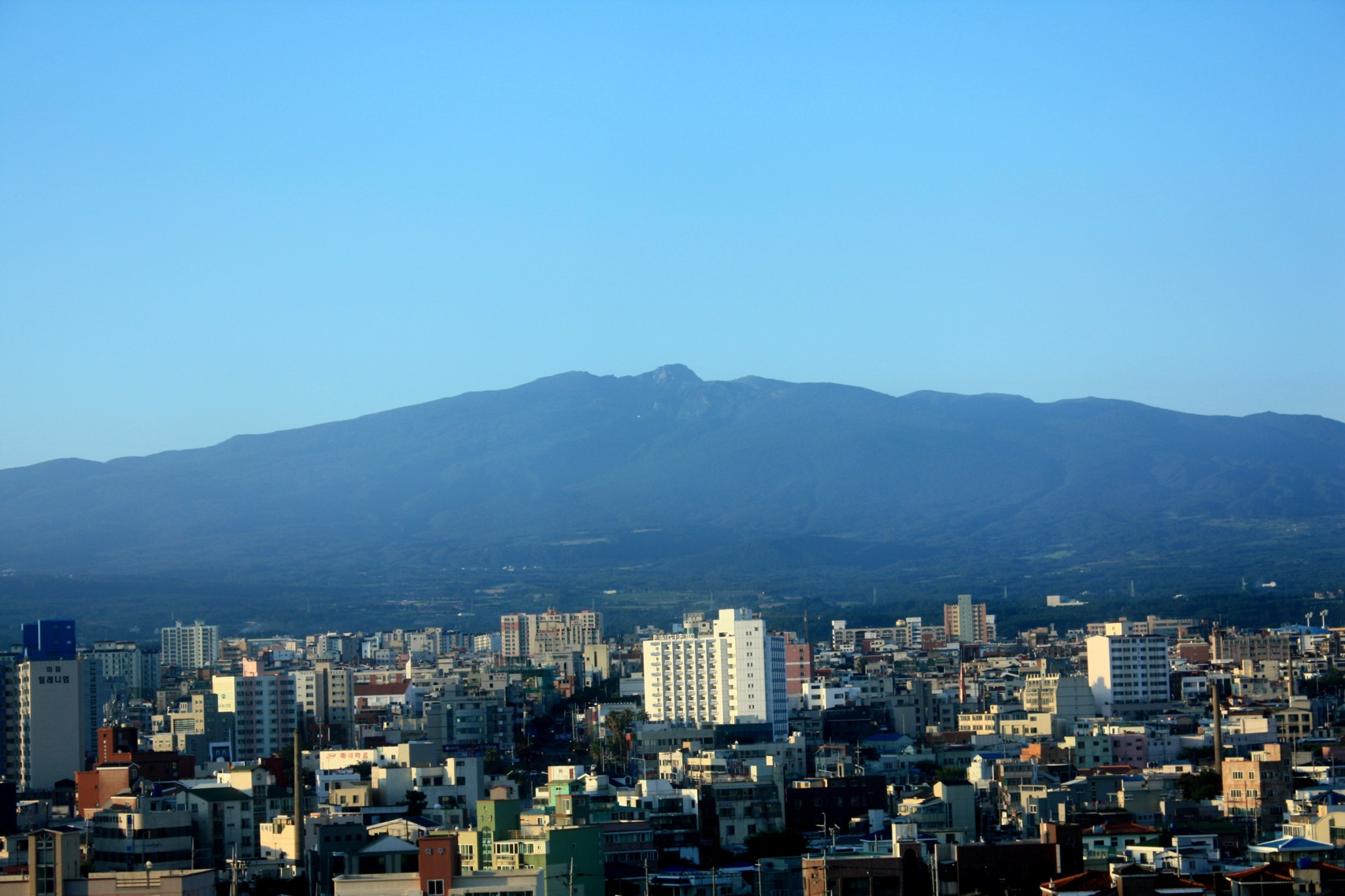
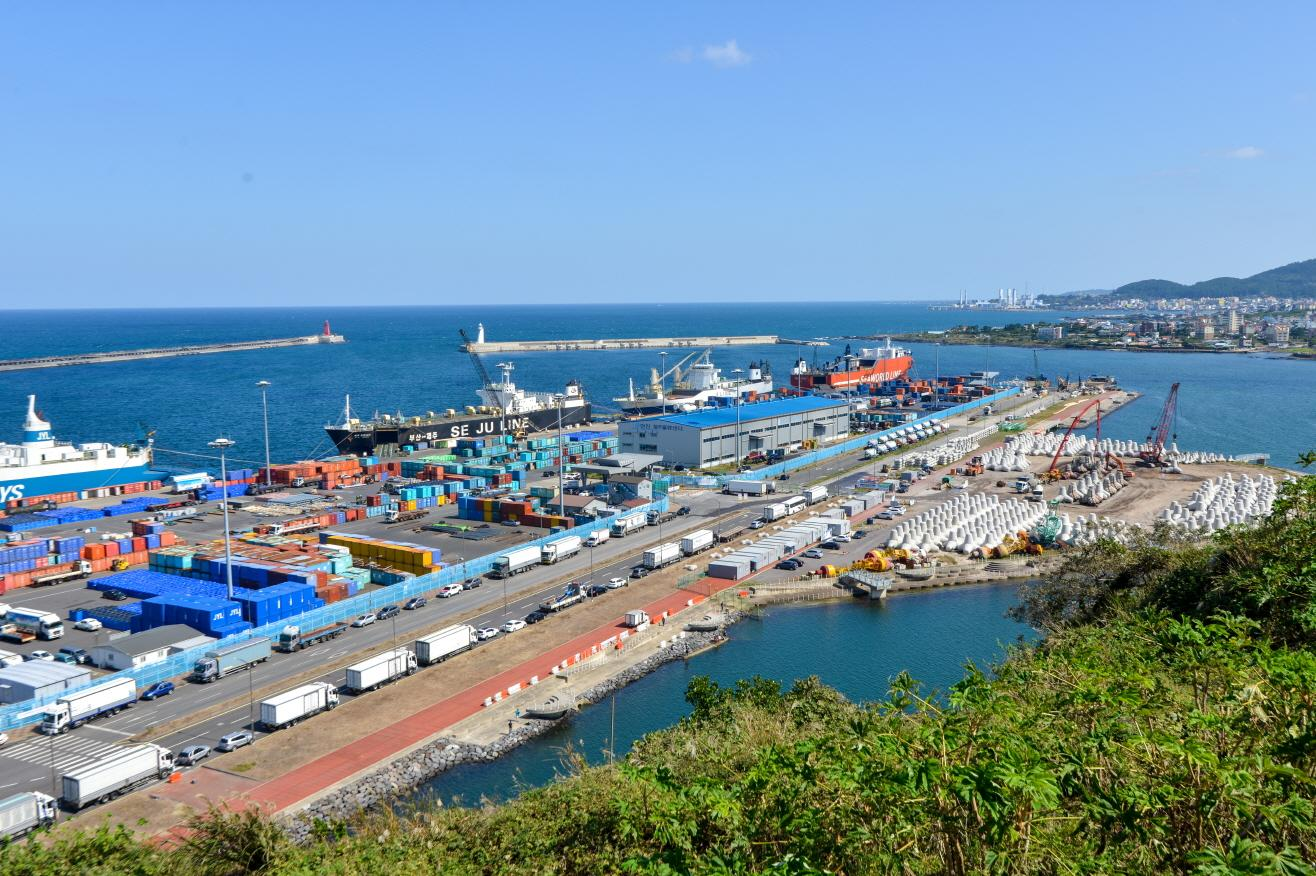
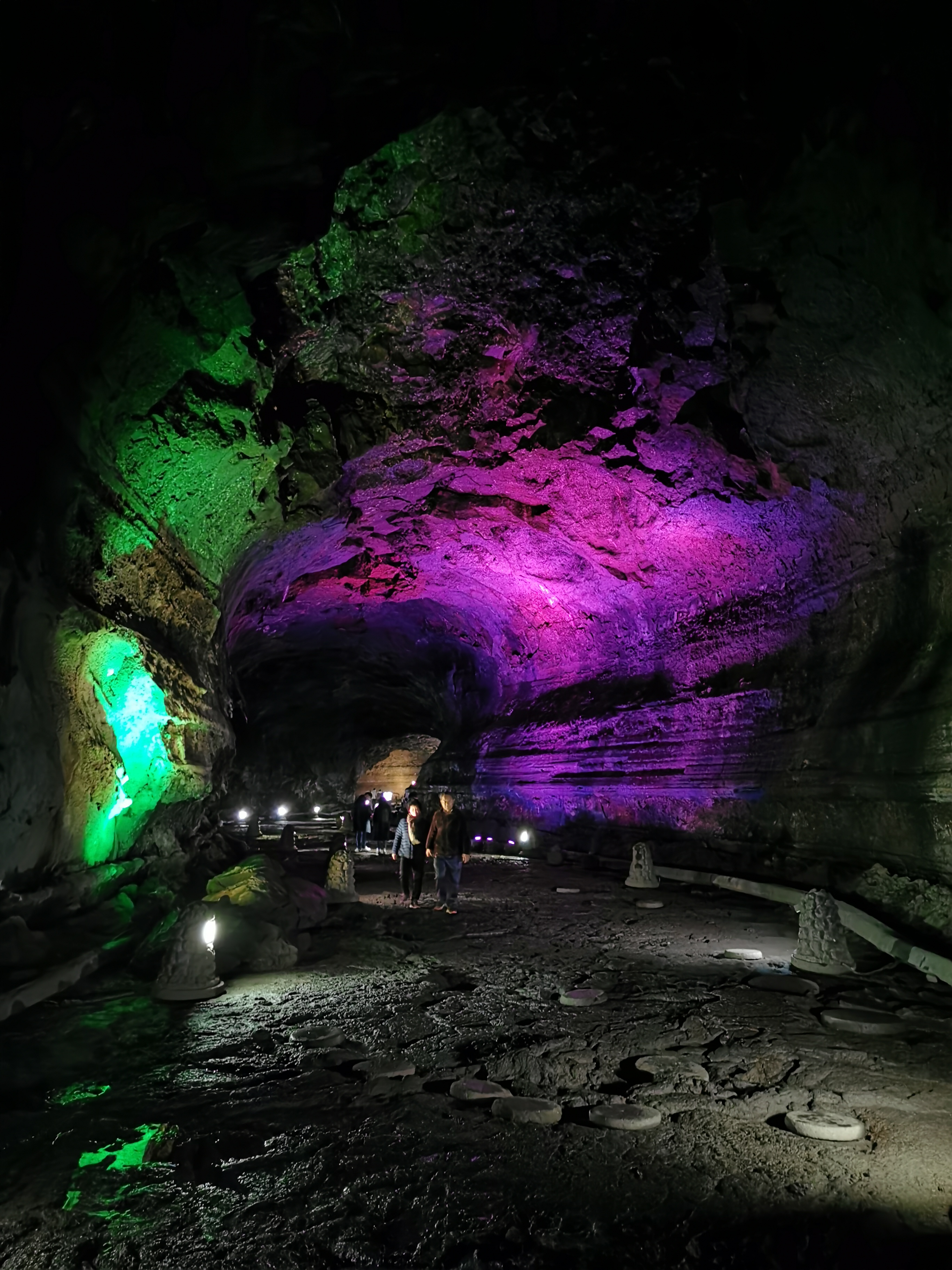
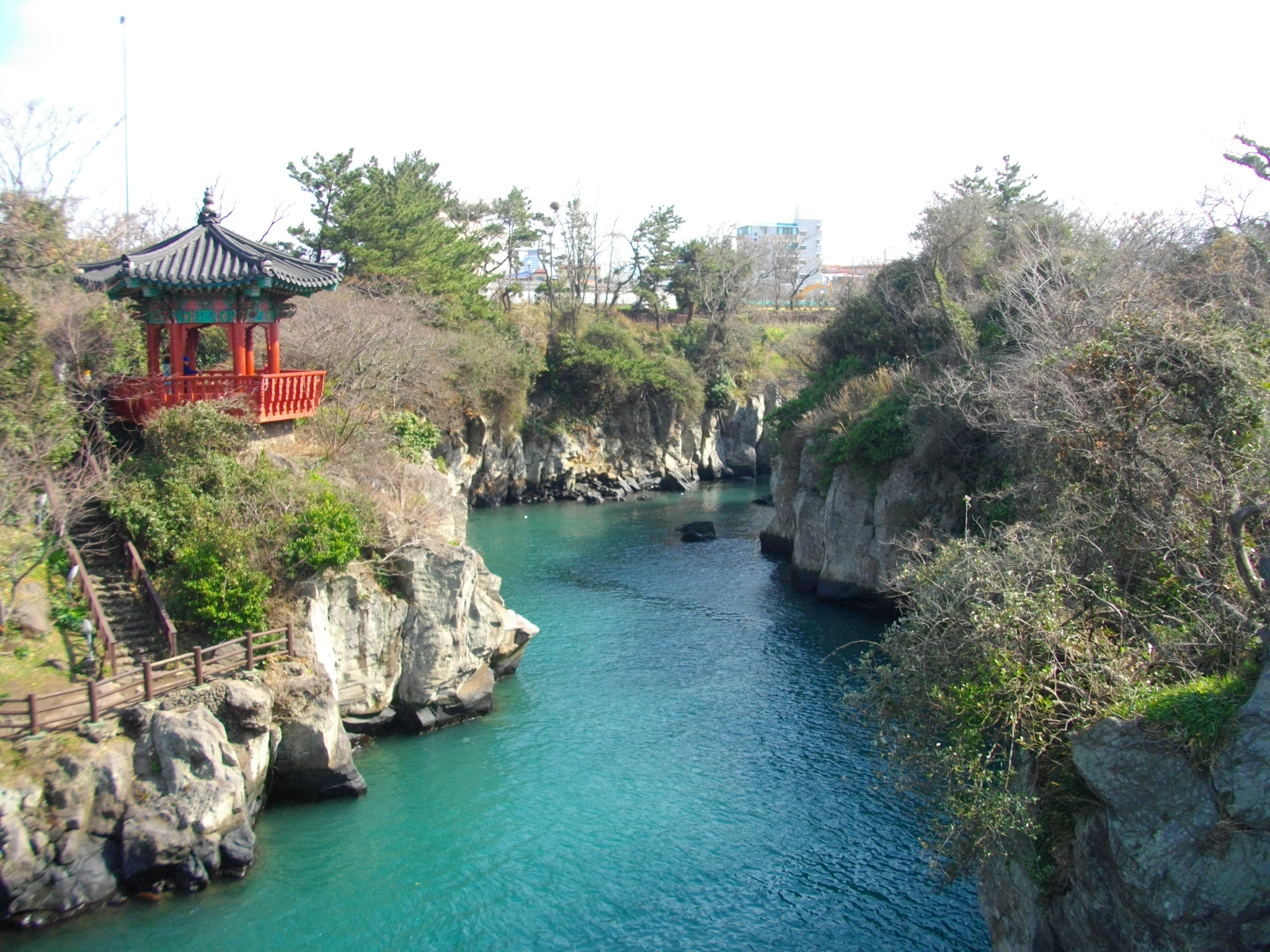
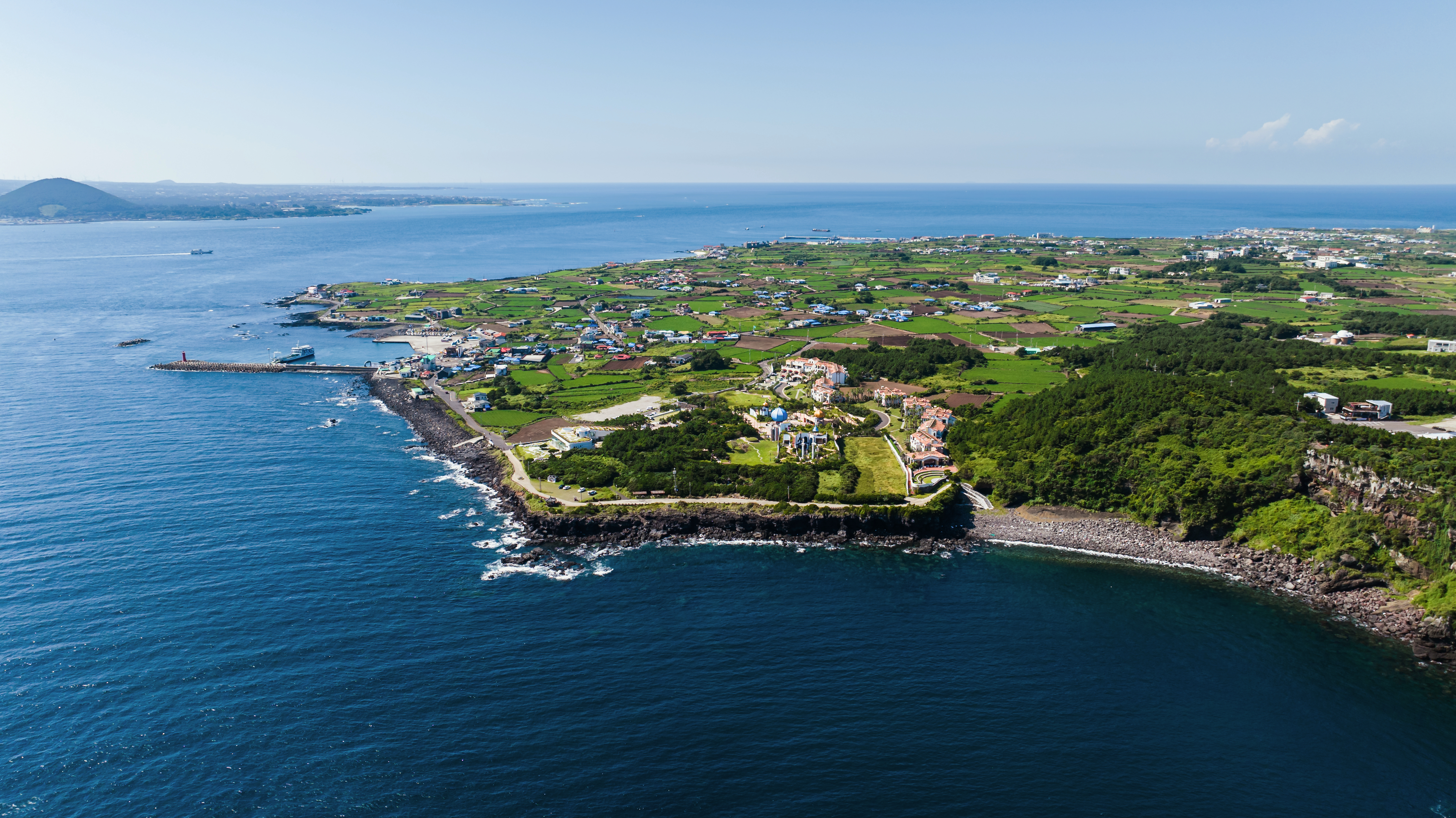
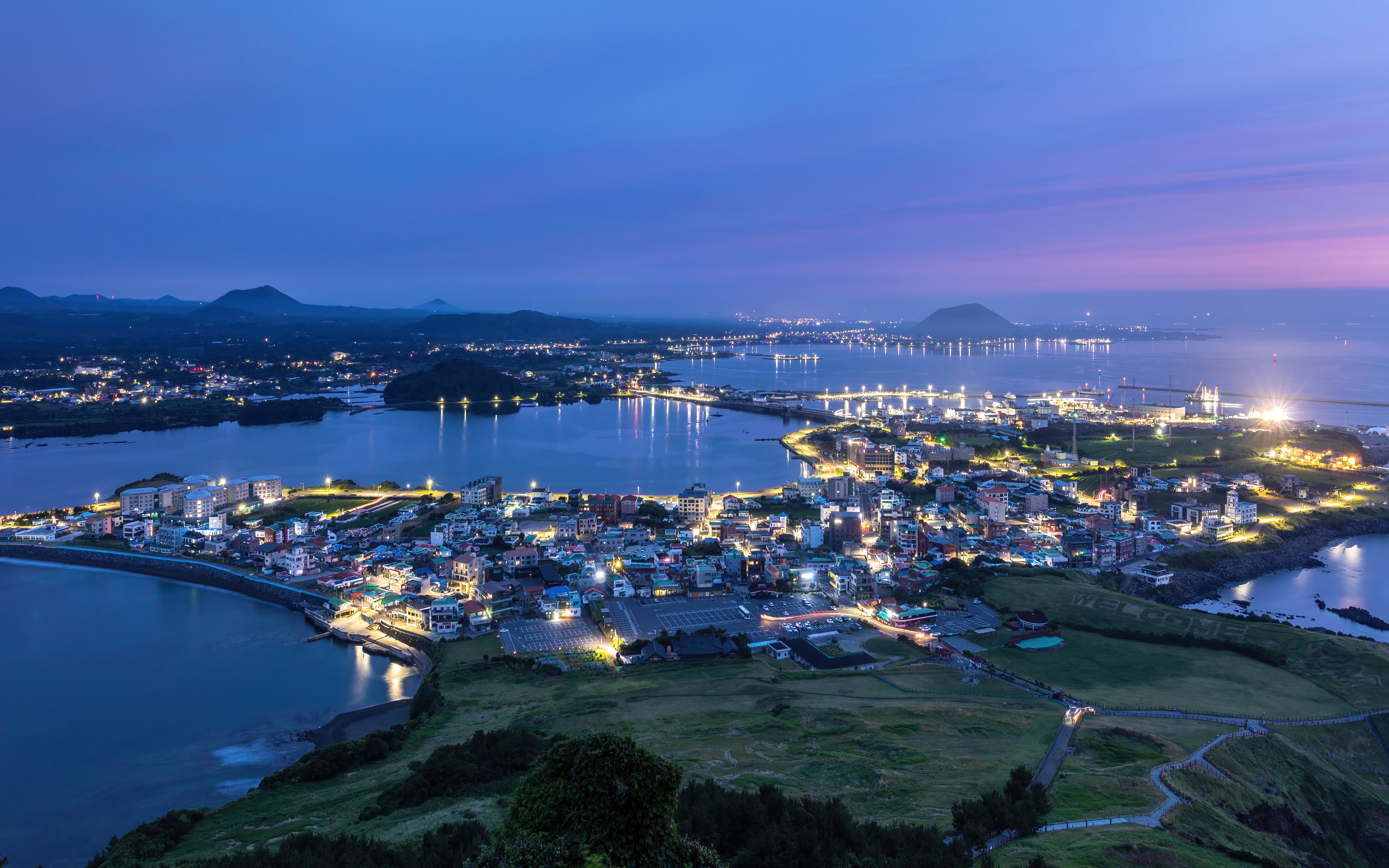
- Downtown Jeju, with Hallasan in the background Port of Jeju Manjanggul Yongdam-dong Udo Island Seongsan-ri

- Emblem of Jeju City (2000 - 2006)

- Location in South Korea
- Coordinates: 33°30′47″N 126°31′23″E
- Country: South Korea
- Province: Jeju
- Administrative divisions: 19 dong, 4 eup, 3 myeon

Government
  - Type: Mayor appointed by governor, no city council (unique in Korea due to Jeju's autonomy)
  - Mayor: Kim Wan-geun (Independent)

Area
  - Total: 977.8 km^{2} (377.5 sq mi)

Population
  - Total: 488,844
  - Density: 503.18/km^{2} (1,303.2/sq mi)
  - Dialect: Jeju
- Website: jejusi.go.kr

Korean name
- Hangul: 제주시
- Hanja: 濟州市
- RR: Jeju-si
- MR: Cheju-si

Jeju City (Korean: 제주; Korean pronunciation: [tɕe.dʑu]) is the capital of the Jeju Province in South Korea and the largest city on Jeju Island. The city is served by Jeju International Airport (IATA code CJU).

Located on an island off the Korean Peninsula, Jeju has mild, warm weather during much of the year. The city is a well-known resort, with prestigious hotels and public casino facilities. In 2011, 9.9 million passengers flew between the two cities of Seoul and Jeju, making the Gimpo–Jeju route the world's busiest passenger air route.

Jeju welcomes over ten million visitors every year, mainly from the South Korean mainland, Japan, and China. The population of Jeju City is 486,604 people and 225,139 households (244,468 men and 245,136 women, May 2024). The population density is 503.18 (per square km, 2020).

== History ==
The area of the city has played a central role in Jeju since before recorded history. The Samseonghyeol, holes from which the three ancestors of the Jeju people are said to have come, are located in downtown Jeju City.

During the Japanese rule of Korea, Jeju was renamed to Saishū.

In 1948, the Jeju uprising began on 3 April, when approximately 350 armed members of the communist Worker’s Party of South Korea attacked 12 police substations across Jeju Island, including in Jeju-eup. The uprising opposed police repression and the separate elections planned for South Korea.The insurgents sought to seize the city as part of their broader attempt to overthrow government authority on Jeju. It was followed by a military campaign against the insurgents and widespread massacres of civilians that killed at least 10,000 people. In March 1949, the establishment of the Jeju District Combat Command marked a shift in the government's suppression campaign, which continued throughout the year.

The city has grown quite rapidly since the 1970s. Shin Jeju (신제주), or "new Jeju", was created some decades ago, up the hill from the airport and houses many government buildings. The thatched roof buildings that were common throughout the city until the 1970s are gradually disappearing.

The city was separated from Bukjeju County in 1955. However, in 2005 Jeju Province voters approved a proposal to merge the city with Bukjeju County, also merging Seogwipo with Namjeju County to create two large cities directly administered by the province. That change was put into effect in July 2006.

In 2012 Sang-Oh Kim became mayor; he was formerly the Jeju regional president of National Agricultural Cooperative Federation.

== Transportation ==
Jeju City is the principal transportation center for Jeju Province. It is home to the island's sole airport, Jeju International Airport. The Jeju-Seoul route is the world's busiest air route with more than 100 flights per day.

In addition, its port is the largest on the island, serving the great majority of passenger and cargo vessels that visit the island. It also stands at the center of the island's road network. To travel throughout the city and island, various buses are available. A bus ride from Jeju City to Seogwipo (the second largest city on the island) is typically an hour.

== Economy ==
Due to its central position in transportation, Jeju City sees the main share of tourist traffic to the island. Many tourists arrive at the city through the port terminal or airport, stay in the tourist hotels of the Sinjeju neighborhood, and stay within the city to visit various Jeju tourist attractions. These include Dragon's Head Rock (Yongduam) along the coast; the Samseonghyeol, three holes in the downtown area; Hallasan National Park in the interior; the country's tallest mountain, Hallasan; and world's largest botanical garden, Bunjae Artpia. The 8,500-seat Jeju Baseball Stadium is near the center of the city.

The city also sells many oranges for which Jeju is famous. Jeju City is surrounded by orange and mandarin farms.

Jeju Air has its headquarters in Jeju City.

== Geography ==
In its former boundaries, Jeju City was 19.3 kilometers from east to west, and 10.2 kilometers from north to south. To the north, it looks across the Korea Strait at the southern coast of South Jeolla Province. To the south, it meets Seogwipo at the top of Hallasan, the island's sole mountain.

== Tourism ==
The Jeju Olle Trail and Jeju Olle Walking Festival passes through the city.

The island Udo, one of Jeju's most popular tourist attractions, is located off the city's east coast. It received 2.23 million visitors in 2016. Seongsan Ilchulbong, an unusually bowl-shaped mountain, is popular for seeing the first sunrise of the year. Around that time, it hosts a sunrise festival with performances and food.

The city has Jeju Stone Park in Jocheon. The large park focuses on Jeju's cultural use of stones, its mythology, and its shamanism. The Jeju National Museum is located in the city proper, near the center. The Kimnyoung Maze Park is in the city. The Buddhist temple Yakcheonsa has a natural mineral spring claimed to have healing powers, and is one of the largest temples in East Asia. It participates in the Templestay program, where guests can stay at Buddhist temples and experience Buddhist culture.

== Demographics ==
Historical population
Year	Pop.	±% p.a.
1980	290,116	—
1990	341,482	+1.64%
2000	367,364	+0.73%
2010	401,192	+0.88%
2015	451,758	+2.40%
2020	492,306	+1.73%
Source: Citypopulation

== Climate ==
Jeju City has a humid subtropical climate (Köppen: Cfa) with very warm summers and cool winters. In Holdridge classification, Jeju City has a warm temperate moist forest climate. Due to its southern location, Jeju City is one of the warmest cities in Korea. However, ocean effect snow brings winter precipitation such as snow showers with strong wind during the winter. Precipitation is significant throughout the year, but is much wetter in summer, with more than 180 millimetres (7.1 in) of rain falling in each month from June to September. The highest temperature ever recorded is 37.5 °C (99.5 °F) on 25 July 1942 while the lowest temperature ever recorded is −6.0 °C (21.2 °F) on 16 February 1977.

Climate data for Ildo 1-dong, Jeju City (1991–2020 normals, extremes 1923–present)
Month	Jan	Feb	Mar	Apr	May	Jun	Jul	Aug	Sep	Oct	Nov	Dec	Year
Record high °C (°F)	23.6 (74.5)	24.5 (76.1)	28.8 (83.8)	30.9 (87.6)	33.1 (91.6)	34.5 (94.1)	37.5 (99.5)	37.5 (99.5)	35.1 (95.2)	32.1 (89.8)	26.7 (80.1)	23.3 (73.9)	37.5 (99.5)
Mean daily maximum °C (°F)	8.6 (47.5)	9.9 (49.8)	13.3 (55.9)	18.0 (64.4)	22.1 (71.8)	24.9 (76.8)	29.3 (84.7)	30.1 (86.2)	26.1 (79.0)	21.6 (70.9)	16.4 (61.5)	11.0 (51.8)	19.3 (66.7)
Daily mean °C (°F)	6.1 (43.0)	6.8 (44.2)	9.8 (49.6)	14.2 (57.6)	18.3 (64.9)	21.7 (71.1)	26.2 (79.2)	27.2 (81.0)	23.3 (73.9)	18.6 (65.5)	13.3 (55.9)	8.3 (46.9)	16.2 (61.2)
Mean daily minimum °C (°F)	3.7 (38.7)	4.0 (39.2)	6.6 (43.9)	10.8 (51.4)	15.0 (59.0)	19.1 (66.4)	23.7 (74.7)	24.8 (76.6)	20.9 (69.6)	15.7 (60.3)	10.4 (50.7)	5.6 (42.1)	13.4 (56.1)
Record low °C (°F)	−5.8 (21.6)	−6.0 (21.2)	−4.1 (24.6)	−0.2 (31.6)	4.0 (39.2)	9.2 (48.6)	15.0 (59.0)	15.8 (60.4)	9.8 (49.6)	5.5 (41.9)	0.5 (32.9)	−3.6 (25.5)	−6.0 (21.2)
Average precipitation mm (inches)	67.5 (2.66)	57.2 (2.25)	90.6 (3.57)	89.7 (3.53)	95.6 (3.76)	171.2 (6.74)	210.2 (8.28)	272.3 (10.72)	227.8 (8.97)	95.1 (3.74)	69.5 (2.74)	55.6 (2.19)	1,502.3 (59.15)
Average precipitation days (≥ 0.1 mm)	12.2	10.2	10.3	9.4	9.8	11.7	11.8	13.2	11.2	6.7	9.8	11.5	127.8
Average snowy days	7.2	4.2	1.0	0.0	0.0	0.0	0.0	0.0	0.0	0.0	0.4	5.3	18.1
Average relative humidity (%)	64.0	63.3	63.2	64.8	68.4	77.9	78.3	76.2	73.7	66.4	65.0	64.1	68.8
Mean monthly sunshine hours	70.2	110.0	166.0	196.5	212.2	159.7	189.8	195.1	158.9	173.3	123.7	79.1	1,834.5
Percentage possible sunshine	22.2	34.0	42.8	49.8	49.2	39.7	44.7	47.2	43.5	50.7	40.2	27.4	41.7
Source: Korea Meteorological Administration (percent sunshine 1981–2010)

Climate data for Gosan-ri, Hangyeong-myeon, Jeju City (1991–2020 normals, extremes 1988–present)
Month	Jan	Feb	Mar	Apr	May	Jun	Jul	Aug	Sep	Oct	Nov	Dec	Year
Record high °C (°F)	18.8 (65.8)	20.1 (68.2)	21.4 (70.5)	27.3 (81.1)	27.5 (81.5)	29.6 (85.3)	34.3 (93.7)	35.5 (95.9)	32.5 (90.5)	30.3 (86.5)	26.8 (80.2)	21.9 (71.4)	35.5 (95.9)
Mean daily maximum °C (°F)	8.4 (47.1)	9.4 (48.9)	12.5 (54.5)	16.7 (62.1)	20.4 (68.7)	23.7 (74.7)	27.4 (81.3)	29.3 (84.7)	26.1 (79.0)	21.4 (70.5)	16.4 (61.5)	11.0 (51.8)	18.6 (65.5)
Daily mean °C (°F)	6.1 (43.0)	6.6 (43.9)	9.4 (48.9)	13.4 (56.1)	17.1 (62.8)	20.7 (69.3)	24.9 (76.8)	26.4 (79.5)	23.0 (73.4)	18.5 (65.3)	13.5 (56.3)	8.5 (47.3)	15.7 (60.3)
Mean daily minimum °C (°F)	3.8 (38.8)	4.1 (39.4)	6.5 (43.7)	10.5 (50.9)	14.3 (57.7)	18.4 (65.1)	22.9 (73.2)	24.1 (75.4)	20.6 (69.1)	15.9 (60.6)	10.9 (51.6)	5.9 (42.6)	13.2 (55.8)
Record low °C (°F)	−6.2 (20.8)	−3.0 (26.6)	−2.3 (27.9)	3.3 (37.9)	9.2 (48.6)	12.7 (54.9)	16.8 (62.2)	17.1 (62.8)	14.8 (58.6)	7.3 (45.1)	0.8 (33.4)	−2.0 (28.4)	−6.2 (20.8)
Average precipitation mm (inches)	40.6 (1.60)	47.8 (1.88)	76.2 (3.00)	94.7 (3.73)	117.7 (4.63)	158.1 (6.22)	167.7 (6.60)	201.9 (7.95)	120.4 (4.74)	56.9 (2.24)	60.2 (2.37)	40.7 (1.60)	1,182.9 (46.57)
Average precipitation days (≥ 0.1 mm)	10.6	9.0	10.2	9.0	9.6	11.3	11.3	13.1	9.6	6.3	8.6	10.4	119
Average snowy days	5.9	3.0	1.3	0.0	0.0	0.0	0.0	0.0	0.0	0.0	0.3	4.0	14.5
Average relative humidity (%)	66.9	68.0	69.9	74.2	80.2	86.2	89.2	83.9	77.8	69.7	67.9	66.5	75.0
Mean monthly sunshine hours	95.4	131.0	175.4	196.3	205.3	156.0	172.6	219.7	187.4	206.6	150.7	106.3	2,002.7
Percentage possible sunshine	28.7	40.7	45.0	50.3	46.9	36.8	40.4	52.0	50.5	58.8	48.9	34.9	44.7
Source: Korea Meteorological Administration (snow and percent sunshine 1981–2010)

Climate data for Chuja Islands, Jeju City (1993–2020 normals)
Month	Jan	Feb	Mar	Apr	May	Jun	Jul	Aug	Sep	Oct	Nov	Dec	Year
Mean daily maximum °C (°F)	7.2 (45.0)	8.4 (47.1)	11.5 (52.7)	15.6 (60.1)	19.4 (66.9)	22.8 (73.0)	26.8 (80.2)	28.9 (84.0)	25.5 (77.9)	21.0 (69.8)	15.3 (59.5)	9.7 (49.5)	17.7 (63.9)
Daily mean °C (°F)	5.0 (41.0)	5.7 (42.3)	8.6 (47.5)	12.5 (54.5)	16.3 (61.3)	19.9 (67.8)	24.3 (75.7)	26.2 (79.2)	22.9 (73.2)	18.4 (65.1)	12.8 (55.0)	7.5 (45.5)	15.0 (59.0)
Mean daily minimum °C (°F)	2.8 (37.0)	3.3 (37.9)	6.0 (42.8)	10.0 (50.0)	13.9 (57.0)	17.8 (64.0)	22.2 (72.0)	24.2 (75.6)	21.1 (70.0)	16.4 (61.5)	10.6 (51.1)	5.1 (41.2)	12.8 (55.0)
Average precipitation mm (inches)	27.2 (1.07)	40.3 (1.59)	73.0 (2.87)	79.6 (3.13)	92.5 (3.64)	152.7 (6.01)	190.3 (7.49)	201.8 (7.94)	132.9 (5.23)	57.9 (2.28)	46.6 (1.83)	32.9 (1.30)	1,127.7 (44.40)
Average precipitation days (≥ 0.1 mm)	5.9	5.5	7.0	7.7	7.8	8.8	9.1	8.5	6.9	4.6	5.9	7.4	85.1
Source: Korea Meteorological Administration

Climate data for Jeju
Month	Jan	Feb	Mar	Apr	May	Jun	Jul	Aug	Sep	Oct	Nov	Dec	Year
Average sea temperature °C (°F)	14.7 (58.5)	13.6 (56.5)	13.3 (55.9)	14.6 (58.3)	16.7 (62.1)	20.6 (69.1)	24.4 (75.9)	26.1 (79.0)	24.5 (76.1)	21.8 (71.2)	18.9 (66.0)	15.9 (60.6)	18.8 (65.8)
Mean daily daylight hours	10.0	11.0	12.0	13.0	14.0	14.0	14.0	13.0	12.0	11.0	10.0	10.0	12.0
Average Ultraviolet index	3	4	6	8	9	10	11	10	8	6	4	3	6.8
Source #1: seatemperature.org
Source #2: Weather Atlas

== Administrative divisions ==
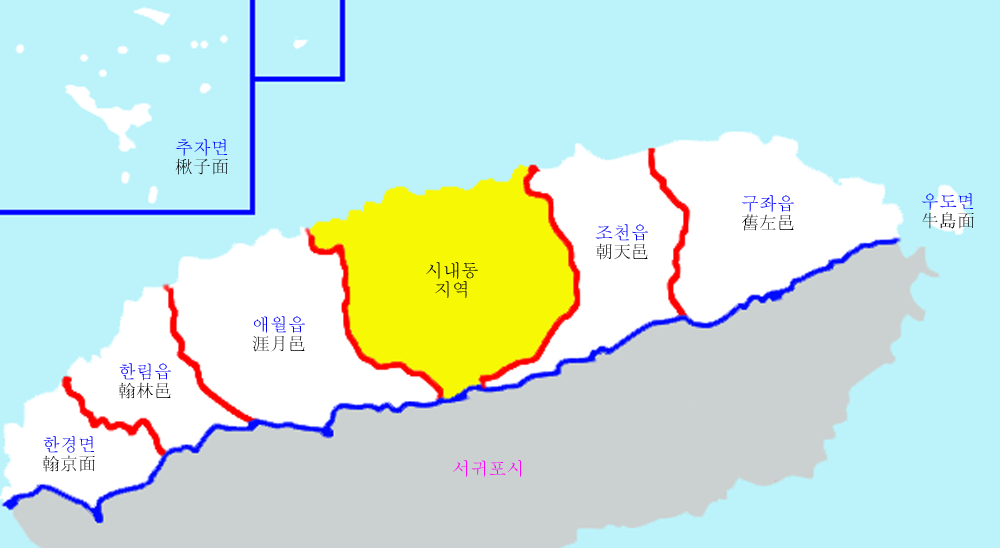
Map of Jeju City with mainly the boundaries of Myeon and Eup represented. All the dongs are represented as a whole as sinaedong (시내동).

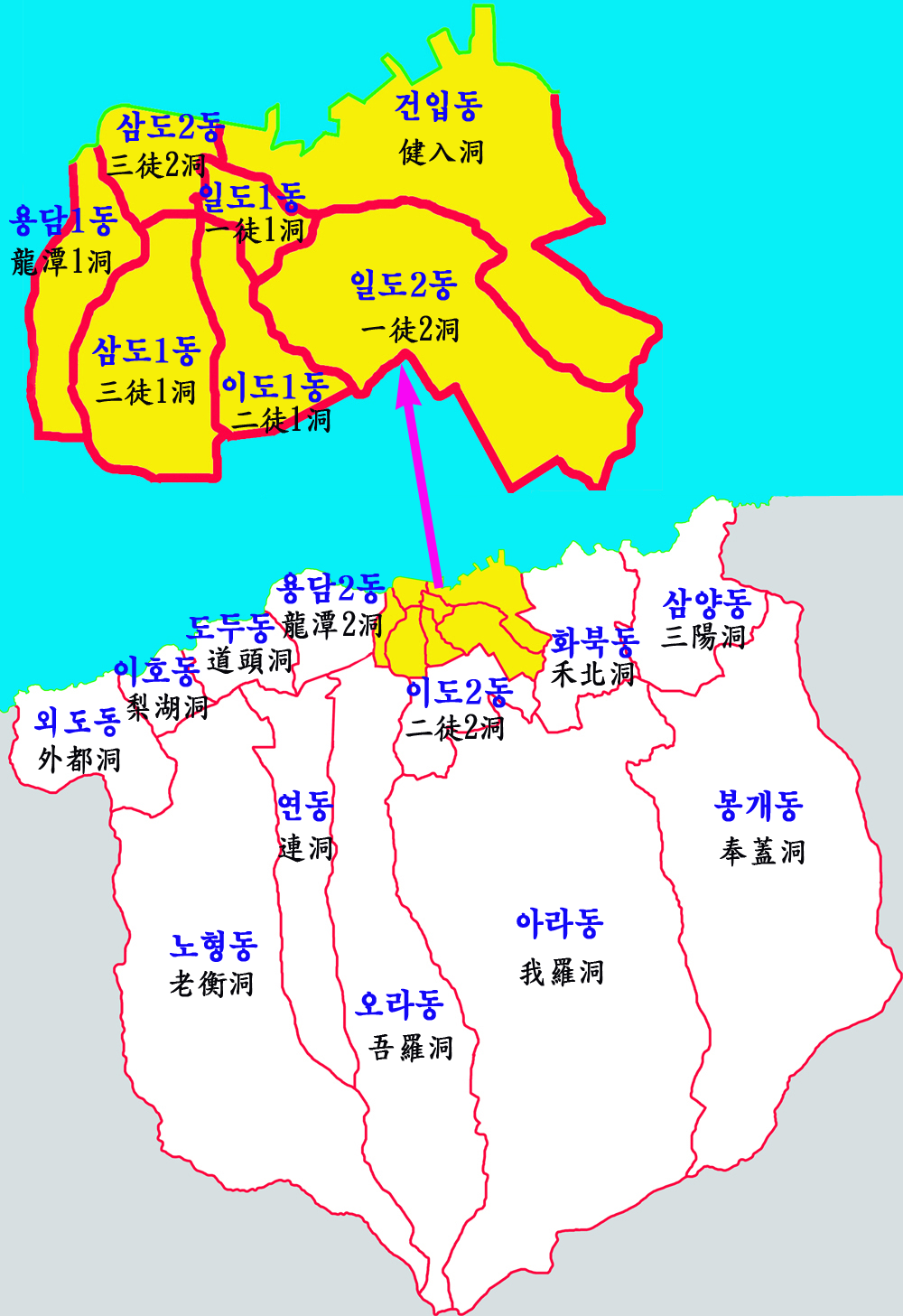
Map of all the dong boundaries represented in detail.

Jeju is divided into 19 neighbourhoods (dong), 4 towns (eup), and 3 townships (myeon):

Town/township	(Korean)	population (2024)
Aewol-eup	애월읍	38,009
Gujwa-eup	구좌읍	15,203
Hallim-eup	한림읍	20,467
Jocheon-eup	조천읍	25,918
Chuja-myeon	추자면	1,580
Hangyeong-myeon	한경면	9,563
Udo-myeon	우도면	1,583

Neighborhood	(Korean)	population (2024)
Ara-dong	아라동	40,448
Bonggae-dong	봉개동	5,166
Dodu-dong	도두동	3,266
Geonip-dong	건입동	8,622
Hwabuk-dong	화북동	23,101
Ido-1-dong	이도1동	7,631
Ido-2-dong	이도2동	48,579
Iho-dong	이호동	4,380
Ildo-1-dong	일도1동	2,194
Ildo-2-dong	일도2동	31,273
Nohyeong-dong	노형동	54,954
Oedo-dong	외도동	22,398
Ora-dong	오라동	16,037
Samdo-1-dong	삼도1동	12,917
Samdo-2-dong	삼도2동	7,815
Samyang-dong	삼양동	22,885
Yeon-dong	연동	42,569
Yongdam-1-dong	용담1동	6,730
Yongdam-2-dong	용담2동	13,956

== Twin towns – sister cities ==
Jeju City is twinned with:

- Guilin, Guangxi, China
- Laizhou, Shandong, China
- Rouen, France
- Sanda, Japan
- Santa Rosa, United States
- Wakayama, Japan

=== Friendship cities ===
- Tokyo, Japan
- Beppu, Japan
- Hunchun, Jilin, China
- Kunshan, Jiangsu, China
- Yangzhou, Jiangsu, China
- Shanghai, China
- Sydney, New South Wales, Australia
- Dubai, United Arab Emirates
- Wellington, New Zealand
- Taipei, Taiwan

=== Memorandum of Understanding ===
- Ulm, Germany

== See also ==
- List of cities in South Korea
- Geography of South Korea
