= Jeju National Museum =

Museum in Jeju, South Korea

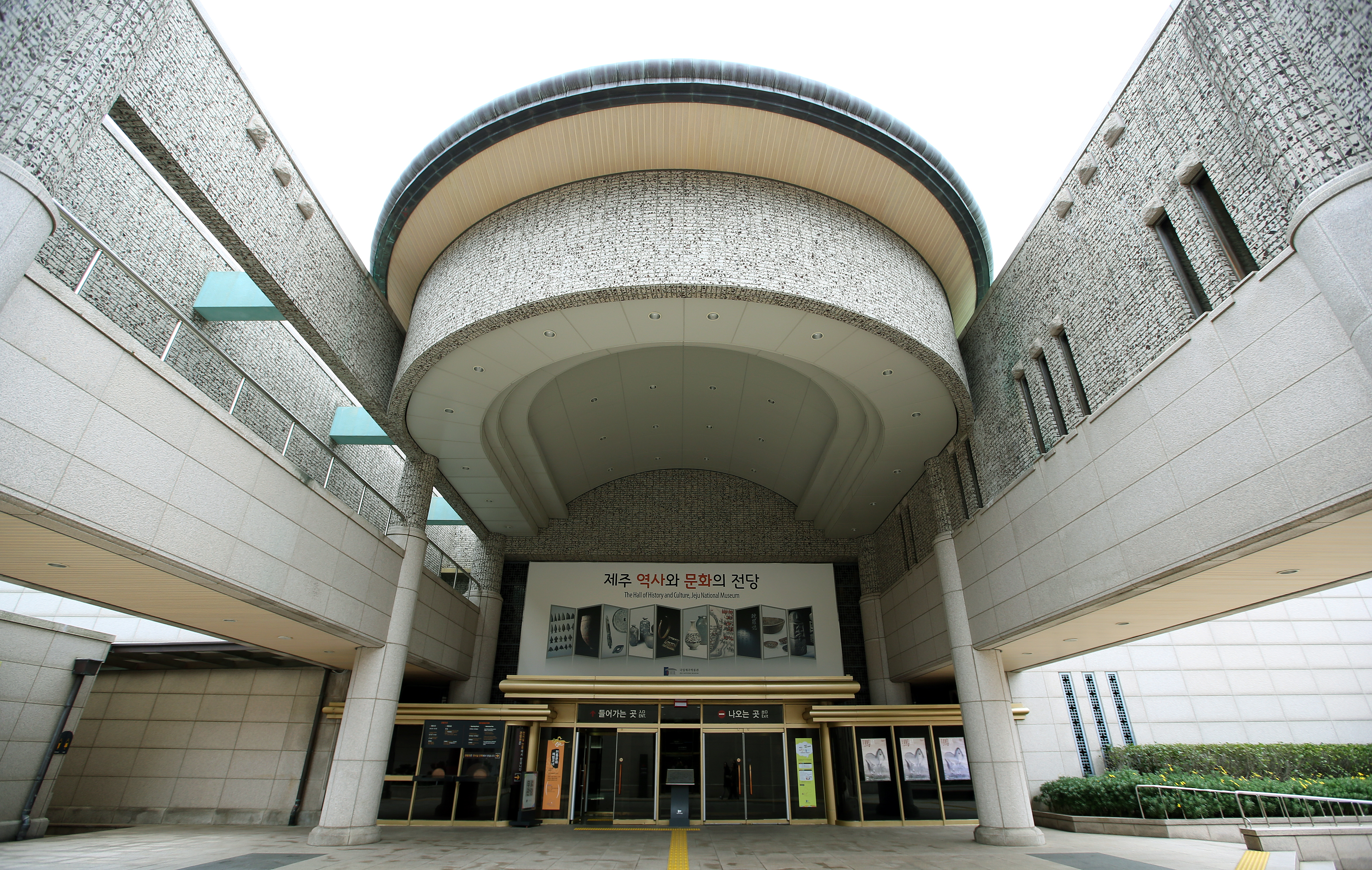
- Exterior of the museum (2014)
- Established: 15 June 2001
- Location: Jeju, South Korea
- Coordinates: 33.513°N 126.548°E
- Type: Archaeology museum Local history museum
- Collection size: 16,000 pieces
- Director: Choi Jeong-ju
- Parking: On-site
- Website: jeju.museum.go.kr/html/en/

Korean name
- Hangul: 국립제주박물관
- Hanja: 國立濟州博物館
- RR: Gungnip Jeju bangmulgwan
- MR: Kungnip Cheju pangmulgwan

Jeju National Museum (Korean: 국립제주박물관) is an archeological and local history museum located in Jeju, South Korea. It opened on June 15, 2001. Construction of the museum began in December 1992 and ended on December 28, 2000. The museum primarily focuses on the archaeology and history of Jeju, South Korea. The museum also specializes in Tamna and the maritime culture of Jeju.

== Construction ==
₩38.6 billion was invested to construct the building for the museum.

== See also ==
- List of museums in South Korea
- Dol hareubang
