= Port of Jeju =

- Click on the map for a fullscreen view

Location
- Country: South Korea
- Location: Jeju
- Coordinates: 33.5224°N 126.5408°E
- UN/LOCODE: KRCHA

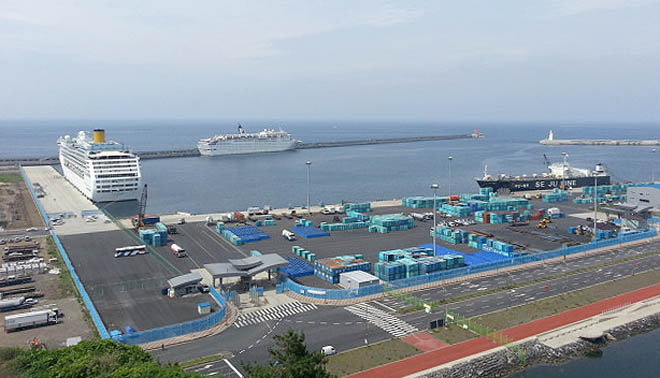
Outer port of Jeju

The Port of Jeju (Korean: 제주항; Hanja: 濟州港) is a port and cruise ship terminal in South Korea, located in the city of Jeju. The Port of Jeju is used for cruise ships and exports of goods. Jeju island is home to the second biggest airport in South Korea after Incheon.

== History ==
Jeju (also romanized as Cheju) was made into a seaport around 1913 but it has had a long cultural importance. Inside the port there are three holes named Samseonghyeol (Caves of the Three Clans), as stated in legend the three ancestral families (the Samseong-Ko, Pu, and Yang) of Jeju came from to inhabit the island. The name Jeju wasn't used until 1221. Under the reign of King Ui-jong the island was named Tamna-hyeon. From 1105 to 1153 it was called Taman-Gun by order of the Goryeo court. Before the name changes it was known simply as Takna.

The Port held the Hangpaduseong fortress in 1271 during a struggle between rebels versus the Goryeo army and the allied Mongols. The Goryeo army won taking the rebels out after two years. Afterwards in 1273 a military governor was in place for around a hundred years. The system was put in place by Goryeo King Wonjong. With this new centralized government the previous independence of the island was ended. For brief period in 1895 a vice governor was instated by King Gojong. The name of the island was also changed from Jeju-mok to Jeju-bu.

During the early 20th century the Port went through a few changes. By 1910 the county chief system replaced the Moksa system that was fading since 1906. At that time Japan occupied Korea and replaced the county chief system with their Island system. The Port of Jeju received township status in 1931, the only town on island to receive that status. Post World War II the Port of Jeju regained its independence in 1946. Two years later a rebellion resulted in burning the Port of Jeju provincial administrative building, which was rebuilt in 1952. Three years after, the township was expanded to a city with 40 administrative wards, later reduced to 14 in 1962.

The 1980s brought more changes with new administrative are and a new provincial office building. Jeju was made up of the city port, two counties, seven townships, six districts, and 17 wards. In 1993 a plan for a joint civilian military port was made. The civilian military complex port was opened to the public in 2016 and can house two 150,000 ton ships. In 2017, the port received funding to further develop cruise ship capacity.

From 2017 until 2023, China banned its cruise ships from visiting the port but visits resumed in August 2023.

== Bibliography ==
Sung Chan Kim, and Seok-ho Kang. “Importance of Jeju Civilian-Military Port.” PacNet Newsletter, no. 91, Dec. 2013, p. 1.

양정철, and 황경수. “다목적 가변 모형을 통한 제주지역 크루즈항구의 모항여건 분석에 관한연구 -한 ․ 중 ․ 일 주요항만비교를 통한-.” Journal of the Korea Academia-Industrial Cooperation Society, vol. 18, no. 2, Feb. 2017, pp. 243–253.

“Port of Jeju (Cheju).” World Port Source, www.worldportsource.com/ports/review/KOR_Port_of_Jeju_Cheju__1486.php.

“Port of Jeju.” Asia Cruise Terminal Association, www.asiacruiseterminal.org/members/port-of-jeju.
