= Jeju Fortress =

Walled old town of Jeju city, South Korea

- The reconstructed portion of the wall

- Location within South Korea
- 33°30′36.5″N 126°31′32″E
- Type: City wall
- Location: 1437-6, Ido 1-dong, Jeju City, Jeju Special Self-Governing Province, South Korea

History
- Built: c. 1411
- Demolished: 1926
- Rebuilt: 2015

Site notes
- Length: 170 metres (560 ft)
- Condition: Partial
- Public access: Yes

Korean name
- Hangul: 제주읍성
- Hanja: 濟州邑城
- RR: Jejueupseong
- MR: Chejuŭpsŏng

The Jeju Fortress (Korean: 제주읍성; Hanja: 濟州邑城; RR: Jejueupseong) was a set of fortifications that turned the historical Jeju City into a walled town. The only surviving major portion is officially referred to as Jejuseongji (제주성지; 濟州城址). The site of Jeju City has been important to the administration of the island of Jeju since the time when the island was an independent kingdom named Tamna. It remained an important site when Tamna was absorbed into the Goryeo kingdom in 1105, and in all administrations since then. It is likely that there was some form of fortification in the Tamna or Goryeo periods, although written references are vague and no archeological remains have been found. The structure now generally referred to as the Jeju Fortress comes from the Joseon period, when walled towns were viewed as important for both defense and administration. It is unknown precisely when the Jeju Fortress was constructed, and whether it was built on a pre-existing structure, but a fortress of some form existed in 1408, and there are records of construction in 1411.

The fortifications constructed in 1411 were located between two streams: the Byeongmuncheon to the west and the Sanjicheon to the east. The walls were likely constructed from local basalt. The coastline lay to their north, while the southern wall was built where the terrain began to slope upwards towards Hallasan Mountain. Gates were built into the eastern, southern, and western walls, with a road connecting the government complex and the eastern gate serving as the city's main thoroughfare. The walls were modified a number of times, most notably in 1565 when they were expanded east across the Sanjicheon. Two gates were later constructed where the Sanjicheon met the northern and southern walls. An inner wall was constructed along the western bank of the Sanjicheon in 1780 to help manage flooding.

The fortress was demolished after Korea came under Japanese rule in 1910. Different sections were demolished in different years, with the final destruction occurring in 1926, when material from the walls was used to expand the city's port. The former wall locations gradually became used for other purposes, such as roads. The area formerly encompassed by the walls slowly lost its distinct identity as Jeju City expanded southwards and government institutions moved to new locations.

The only remaining large section of the wall, part of the southern wall adjoining Ohyeondan Altar, was listed as a historic site of Jeju Province on August 26, 1971. Research into this site began in the 1990s, and by 2015 around 170 metres (560 ft) had been restored. A small number of other surviving parts of the wall are known, the largest being only 17 metres (56 ft). Of the dol hareubang statues that once guarded the city's gates, 47 of the 48 have survived, although all have been relocated. The foundation stones of some removed in the 1960s remain in their original positions. References to the fortress have survived in placenames and street names, and some markers have been placed where the wall has disappeared.

== History ==
=== Earlier fortress ===
The area that is now Jeju City has been an important administrative site since the time of the independent Tamna kingdom. This importance continued after Tamna was annexed by the Goryeo in 1105. It is thought that a fortress existed somewhere near what became the old city from either the Tamna or Goryeo periods, although there are no surviving written records of its exact location. It is unknown precisely what relation this earlier structure may have had to the Joseon construction. The Joseon fortress may have been a rebuilding or extension of this previous site, or an entirely new construction. Archeological finds from Jeju City evidence interaction with trade routes between Southern Song China and Japan, uncovering artifacts including a Wu Zhu coin.

The Joseon-era Veritable Records of Taejong suggests that the Tamna kingdom had a fortress along the central northern coast. The Sinjŭng Tongguk yŏji sŭngnam and Jeungbo Tamnaji mention an older structure (고성; 古城) as having existed during the Goryeo Dynasty. When these writings were made, the structure was already considered to be in ruins. This was recorded as lying to the northwest of the Joseon fortress. The placename "Mugeunseong" (무근성), coming from (근성; 古城; lit. 'old (다/古) fortress (성/城)'), exists today as a street name in the Samdo-2-dong district. This location corresponds to the placename "Jinseong" (진성; 陳城), also meaning old fortress, which is also used in some historical maps. A historical marker was erected on Mugeunseong street by a local group in June 2009 to mark the location of the old fortress. However, no archeological evidence has been found of a large settlement on that site.

There is evidence of some possibly Tamna-era structures within what became the Joseon city. The Jejuhyanggyo Confucian School was built within what became the city in 1392. The 1432 Sejong sillok chiriji (part of the Veritable Records of Sejong) records a stone fortress of 910 bo (paces, around 1.137 kilometres (0.706 mi)). This is about 1,000 cheok less than the length given in later records, and so may be a measure of the old fortress. There are two guardian statues that are located to the east and west of the Joseon fortress. Their origin is unknown, but they may date back to the Goryeo period.

=== Joseon construction ===
Beginning in the late Goryeo period, the coastline of Korea saw frequent attacks from wokou pirates. The (post-Goryeo) Joseon kings saw constructing walled towns as a useful defensive measure against such attacks, as well as a measure to increase central authority. Coastal towns began to be extensively fortified under Sejong the Great, and walled towns became an important component of Joseon administration.

The exact date of the Joseon-era Jeju Fortress' construction is not known. A fortress is mentioned in records of a 1408 flood. The Veritable Records of Taejong records that the walls of the fortress were repaired and expanded in 1411. This 1411 structure was built between two streams: the Byeongmuncheon to the west and the Sanjicheon to the east. The location lay at the edge of the coastal plain, with terrain rising from its south towards Hallasan mountain. During high tides, shipping could reach the sea through the Sanjicheon. The city was laid out along an east-west axis, with the focal point being a plaza (where Gwandeokjeong Pavilion was constructed in 1448). The main thoroughfare ran from this plaza towards the east. The road from the plaza to the west gate was likely not for public use. Like many structures in Jeju, the Jeju Fortress was constructed from basalt, which is common throughout the island. Material was thus likely quarried locally. Basalt is relatively resistant to water damage, which helped preservation.

A 1702 map of Jeju (south up). The largest label, at the middle of the north coast, marks the Jeju Fortress, while the other red labels represent Jeonguieupseong, Daejeongeupseong, and the nine military camps.

Walled towns were traditionally located against mountains, in locations with easy access to drinking water and agricultural land; a system influenced by ancient Chinese urban planning. The Jeju Fortress was normal in these respects. However, the positioning of Hallasan to the south and the coast to the north was unusual feng shui. This positioning was likely due to the ancient importance of Hallasan to the location (as well as to other areas of Jeju island). Government buildings faced south, towards Hallasan, while Gwandeokjeong faced east. In most walled towns, the road from the southern gate to the gaeksa was the main thoroughfare, rather than the road to the eastern gate. In Jeju, the east road was about 5.5 metres (18 ft) wide, whereas the south road was only 3 metres (9.8 ft) wide. The east road connected the government buildings, including the gaeksa, to the northern river exit that led to the city's port. The road further extended to the port towns of Hwabuk and Jocheon.

A new administrative system was put in place in 1416, under which the Jeju Fortress was responsible for administration of the whole island. The fortress was the first completed part of the new Joseon defensive system. It served directly as the capital of the Jeju-mok administrative area. The rest of the island was covered by the two hyeon (counties) of Jeonguihyeon and Daejeonghyeon. A walled fortress was soon built in each to serve as an administrative center. Aside from these 3 fortresses, the island-wide defensive system included 9 military camps, 25 beacon stations (bongsu), and 38 coastal watchtowers (yeondae). These were positioned to protect the island from invasion. The full system of defences was completed by 1678. Official inspections of the island began at the Jeju Fortress' east gate, and circled the coast before ending at the west gate.

The three walled towns remained the core of the island's administration throughout the Joseon Dynasty. Each had a Hyanggyo school, as well as other government facilities. The governor of the Jeju Fortress, who had both administrative and military roles, held seniority over the leaders of the other two walled towns. The importance of the Jeju Fortress was reflected in its name. The earliest known records call it jejuseong (제주성; 濟州城). When the use of walled towns (읍성; 邑城) spread throughout Joseon, the fortress gained its current name of jejueupseong (제주읍성; 濟州邑城). However, in some later documents it was named jejudoseong (제주도성; 濟州都城). Doseong (도성; 都城) was generally used to refer to capital cities, so the name likely reflected a continued cultural association of Jeju City as the capital of a once-independent Tamna.

=== Later expansion ===
The Jejujojeon (제주조점; 濟州操點) painting from the 1702 Tamna Sullyeokdo, showing the Jeju Fortress

There are written historical records documenting later repairs and modifications to the fortress. The original fortress was likely only 1 kilometre (0.62 mi) long with only three gates: eastern, southern, and western. (The lack of a northern gate was probably a defensive measure, due to the nearby coastline.) The east gate was referred to as yeonsangru (연상루; 延祥樓), the south gate as jeongwonru (정원루; 定遠樓), and the west gate as jinseoru (진서루; 鎭西樓).

The 1481 Sinjŭng Tongguk yŏji sŭngnam records the town walls having a circumference of 4,394 cheok (about 1.318 kilometres (0.819 mi)) and a height of 11 cheok (about 3.3 metres (11 ft)). Adding to the natural defences provided by the two streams, a moat was dug around the walls and drawbridges were constructed in 1512. The wall at this time was 5,486 cheok long. The moat may have been filled with thorny trees rather than water. The addition of a moat was unusual for Korean walled cities.

Wokou besieged the fortress in 1555, but were unable to breach the walls. Following this, the fortress was extended east over the Sanjicheon in 1565. This brought drinking water into the city walls, and encompassed an eastern hill that previously overlooked the fortress and had been used by the wokou. The walls were also raised 5 cheok.

The walls were expanded again in 1599 to strengthen defences following the end of the Imjin War, reaching 6,120 cheok. The wall was widened to 5 cheok, and its height was increased to 13 cheok. Two river gates were built at this time where the Sanjicheon flowed through the northern and southern walls. The northern gate allowed boats to enter the city. It did not have strong defensive structures, likely due to the river gates being vulnerable to flooding. 1599 also saw the construction of new gate towers and other pavilions, including the Jeigak pavilion (제이각; 制夷閣) above the southern river gate. 21 of the 27 bastions were converted to use cannons. A watchtower named jukseoru (죽서루) was placed above the bridge at the northern gate. The 1599 constructions took place during the winter, and resulted in many deaths, giving the fortress the nickname wonchugseong (원축성; 怨築城). The initial three gates and the two river gates would persist throughout later modifications.

An illustration of the Jeju Fortress made some time between 1702 and 1755

Eventually, the outer wall reached 3.2 kilometres (2.0 mi). The land within the walls ranged from 1–25 metres (3.3–82.0 ft) above sea level, although it was only near the high end along the southern and eastern walls. By the time of the 1653 Tamnaji and the Dongguk Yeojiji, the circumference was recorded as 5,489 cheok. The Tamnaji is the oldest record to detail the pavilions, parapets, and other features of the wall. It records that the wall included 27 bastions, and that the parapet included 404 crenellations. The eastern wall had a command post named unjudang (운주당; 運籌堂). The Jejueupji also records a circumference of 5,489 cheok and a height of 11 cheok. Both the Tamnaji and the Yeojidoseo mention the continued existence of a moat and bridges. The Jeungbo Tamnaji is the most detailed historical record.

The east, south, and west gates were each decorated with eight dol hareubang, possibly in 1754. At some point the fortress was surrounded by citrus trees, apparently giving it an orange color when the fruits ripened. In 1780, an inner wall (간성) was built along the western bank of the Sanjicheon to prevent flooding. A north and south gate were added to this new wall. A new fort was constructed on the northern end, where the inner wall met the road heading towards the central plaza, providing protection against both floods and military attacks. This inner wall was about 9 cheok (2.7 metres (8.9 ft)) tall and 551 bo (689 metres (2,260 ft)) long. The northern gate was named subogmun (수복문; 受福門), while the southern gate was named sominmun (소민문; 蘇民門). In 1847, the southern gate was renamed to junginmun (중인문; 重仁門). The northern gate was connected to the gwangjegyo bridge (광제교; 光濟橋).

The British ship HMS Samarang, which surveyed the island of Jeju in 1845, reported that the Jeju Fortress walls were 7.6 metres (25 ft) tall. The 1914 cadastral map suggests the walls were 13–14 metres (43–46 ft) wide in the north, and 6–9 metres (20–30 ft) wide elsewhere. Aerial mapping in 2008 determined that the wall was 3.27 kilometres (2.03 mi) long on the outside (encompassing 497,442 square metres (5,354,420 sq ft)), and 2.75 kilometres (1.71 mi) long on the inside (encompassing 466,569 square metres (5,022,110 sq ft)).

=== Demolition ===
The wall behind the Ohyeondan Altar is the only major section of the fortress that was not demolished

After Korea came under Japanese rule in 1910, the first law passed by the Governor-General of Chōsen was for the destruction of Korea's walled fortresses. The northern river gate was destroyed in 1913. The east and west gates, as well as another gate referred to as the ganseongmun (간성문; 間城門), were destroyed in 1914. The southern river gate was destroyed in 1915, along with most of the northern wall. The southern gate was destroyed in 1918. In 1923, a meteorological observatory was built on part of the eastern wall. The remaining structure was essentially destroyed in 1926, during work to expand the city's port. Material from the walls was used to reclaim land and construct eastern and western piers. Floods in 1927 destroyed the gates near the river.

The destruction of the fortress greatly altered the structure of the old city. While the fortress' shape was still visible in the first-ever cadastral map of the city, produced by Japanese authorities in 1914, later developments have obscured the original position of the walls. In the late 20th century, roads were expanded, particularly with large east-west and north-south roads dividing the old city into four. The Byeongmuncheon, along with the Hancheon, was covered. Parts of the wall's former route are now also roads, as is the former moat. As the city expanded, the original core lost its importance. Major government institutions moved further south, and the area began to decline in the late 1980s. Urban regeneration of the area eventually became a political issue.

There are 53 streets that have maintained some or all of their pre-1910 layout. Some streets retain names referencing the former walls and gates. The former location of the southern river gate retains the placename namsugak (남수각). The whole area formerly within the walls continued to be colloquially referred to as "inside the fortress" (seongan; 성안) until at least the 1970s, although the term has since fallen out of use. The area is now called the wondosim (원도심). It is divided between multiple local governments, which also cover land outside of the former walls.

== Research and reconstruction ==
Remaining wall in 1990

The main surviving section of the wall is located immediately south of the Ohyeondan Altar. The first survey of this section took place in 1990, and led to considerations for how it might be restored. A restoration plan was released in 1999, focused on the south gate. Research excavations were carried out in 2013, along with the creation of a new management plan. Restoration continued from then until 2015. About 170 metres (560 ft) were reconstructed, including the Jeigak pavilion (제이각; 制夷閣), but not including a gate. The restored wall has a height of 3.6–4.3 metres (12–14 ft) and a width of 5.3–6.9 metres (17–23 ft). The Jeigak pavilion was mentioned in the 1601 Namsarok and the 1841 Tamnajichobon. While the parapet is visible in old imagery, it was not included in the restoration. The restoration involved removing ivy that was growing in the interior of the wall, causing visible distortions.

At least six other portions of the inner and outer walls are known to survive, although the largest (outside the meteorological observatory) is only 17 metres (56 ft). In some sites, roof tiles have been discovered which provide evidence of a 19th-century restoration. A previously unknown 84 metres (276 ft) section of remains was uncovered in March 2026. This new discovery included the first known remains of the parapet.

The reconstructed section of the city wall

Marker stones have been placed in some areas to mark the former locations of parts of the wall where there are no more remains, although some are slightly misplaced. Some dol hareubang that were formerly located at the gates have been relocated. Four originally at the west gate were moved to the Gwandeokjeong Pavilion, two were moved to the Jeju Folklore and Natural History Museum, one is now in the Jeju Stone Park, and one is missing. The eight dol hareubang from the eastern gate are possibly split into four pairs in different locations, although their identities have not been confirmed. While most dol hareubang were removed as new roads were constructed, at least four of the east gate dol hareubang remained in place until at least 1966. Their original positions are still marked by foundation stones, as these were not moved with them. The south gate dol hareubang have also been split up and moved multiple times, but are thought to all survive, meaning only one of the 24 has been lost.

Around 230 metres (750 ft) of the walls have been restored, including three bastions. This restored portion was listed as a historic site of Jeju Province (originally No. 3) on August 26, 1971. It is now considered a tourist attraction. This reconstructed site is alternatively known as Jejuseongji (Korean: 제주성지; Hanja: 濟州城址), and is located at 1437-6, Ido 1-dong. Jeju provincial authorities have sought national heritage listing for the rebuilt section.
