= Sungjeonggiwon =

Joseon-era date system in Korea

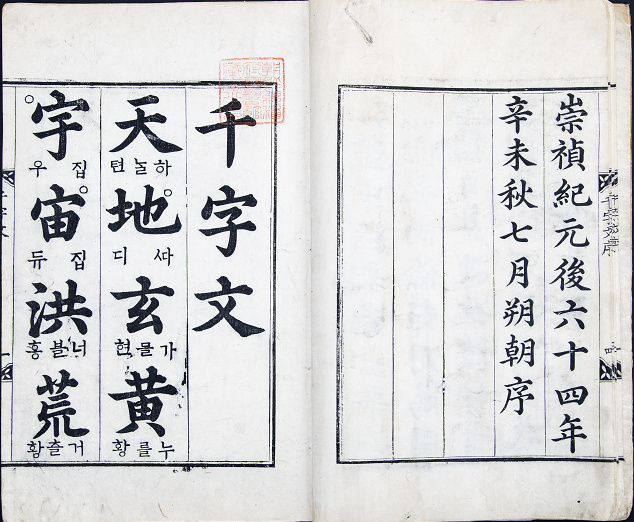
- The Thousand Character Classic, used as a textbook at seodang, contains an example of the Sungjeonggiwon. The preface on the right page records the date as "the Sinmi year, 64 years after Sungjeonggiwon" (崇禎紀元後六十四年辛未), corresponding to 1691 (the 30th year of the Kangxi era of the Qing dynasty)

Korean name
- Hangul: 숭정기원
- Hanja: 崇禎紀元
- RR: Sungjeonggiwon
- MR: Sungjŏnggiwŏn

The Sungjeonggiwon (Korean: 숭정기원; Hanja: 崇禎紀元; lit. 'Age of Sungjeong'), also known as Hwangmyeong Sungjeonggiwon (황명숭정기원; 皇明崇禎紀元) or Hwangmyeonggiwon (황명기원; 皇明紀元), was a dating system used during the Joseon Korea. It was named after Chongzhen (崇禎; Sungjeong), the final era name of Ming China, and reflected Joseon's view that it had inherited the Chinese cultural and political tradition after the fall of the Ming. Beginning with the first year of the Chongzhen era (1628), years were counted as "years after Sungjeonggiwon" (숭정기원후; 崇禎紀元後) or "years after the Sungjeong era" (숭정후; 崇禎後). In some cases, dates were expressed using the sexagenary cycle and ordinal numbers rather than by counting the number of elapsed years.

== History ==
From its foundation, the Joseon dynasty of Korea maintained a tributary relationship with the Ming dynasty of China, received Ming investiture, and adopted Ming era names. In 1637, following the Second Manchu invasion of Korea, King Injo of Joseon surrendered to the Manchu-led Qing dynasty at Samjeondo, and Joseon became a Qing tributary state. After the fall of the Ming dynasty in 1644, the Qing dynasty established its rule over China. Among Joseon's scholar-officials, anti-Qing sentiment and the influence of the Little China ideology led many to continue regarding the Ming as the legitimate successor to the Chinese imperial tradition, while viewing the Qing as illegitimate. Regarding the use of era names, the Joseon court initially continued to use the Chongzhen era name in internal documents. In royal tomb inscriptions, ancestral rites at the royal shrine, and Confucian temple ritual texts, dates were generally recorded without era names. Qing era names began to appear in ritual texts only after 1644, although the use of Ming era names and sexagenary-cycle dating remained common among the general population. After King Sukjong came to the throne (r. 1674–1720), he considered the practice of merely recording dates by the sexagenary cycle insufficient to express Joseon's remembrance of the Ming dynasty. He therefore introduced the practice of dating documents by counting the years after the Chongzhen era, known as the Sungjeonggiwon. The dating system was subsequently used widely throughout Joseon society and remained in use until the reign of King Gojong (1864–1907). In 2016, a traditional house in Wicheon-myeon, Geochang County, South Gyeongsang Province, South Korea, was still using the system on its annual Ipchuncheop (spring calligraphy) board, recording the date as "379 years after the Jeongchuk year of the Sungjeong era" (崇禎丁丑後三百七十九年).

== Examples ==
=== Cumulative year count ===
- 崇禎即位後二十八年 ('28 years after the accession of the Chongzhen Emperor'; 1655)
- 崇禎紀元後八十三年 ('83 years after the beginning of the Sungjeonggiwon'; 1710)
- 崇禎後百三十八年 ('138 years after the Sungjeong era'; 1765)
- 崇禎紀元後二百六十三年 ('263 years after the beginning of the Sungjeonggiwon'; 1890)

=== Year count combined with the sexagenary cycle ===
- 崇禎五十六年癸亥 ('the Gyehae year, the 56th year of the Sungjeong era'; 1683)
- 崇禎七十七年歲次甲申 ('the Gapshin year, the 77th year of the Sungjeong era'; 1704)
- 崇禎紀元九十三年庚子 ('the Gyeongja year, the 93rd year of Sungjeonggiwon'; 1720)
- 皇明紀元後百二十年丁卯 ('the Jeongmyo year, 120 years after Hwangmyeonggiwon'; 1747)

=== Sexagenary cycle with ordinal numbers ===
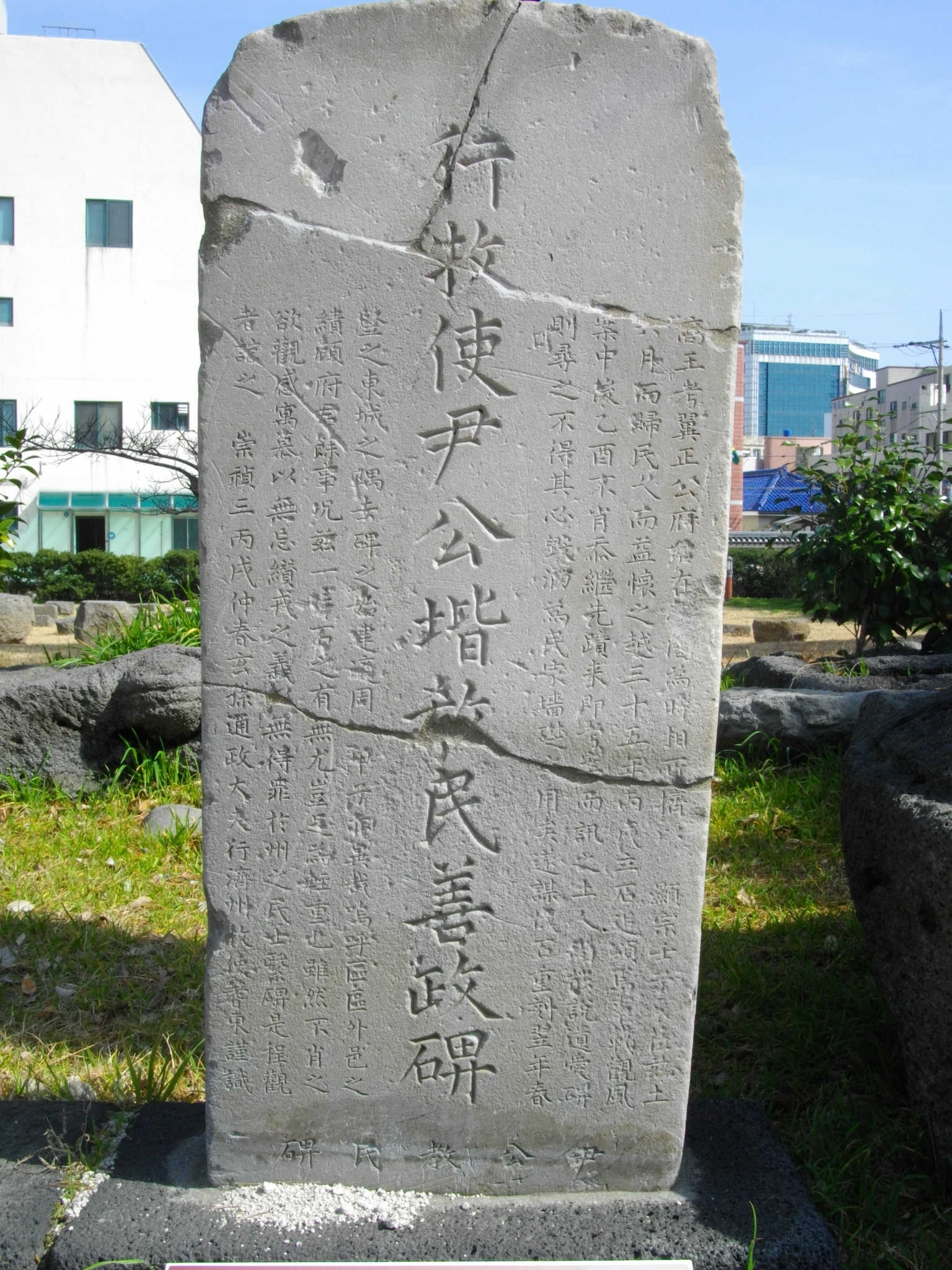
A monument titled "Monument Commemorating the Benevolent Governance and Instruction of the People by Acting Magistrate Yun Gye" at the Jeju-mok Government Office records the date as "the third Byeongsul year after the Sungjeong era" (崇禎三丙戌), corresponding to 1766.

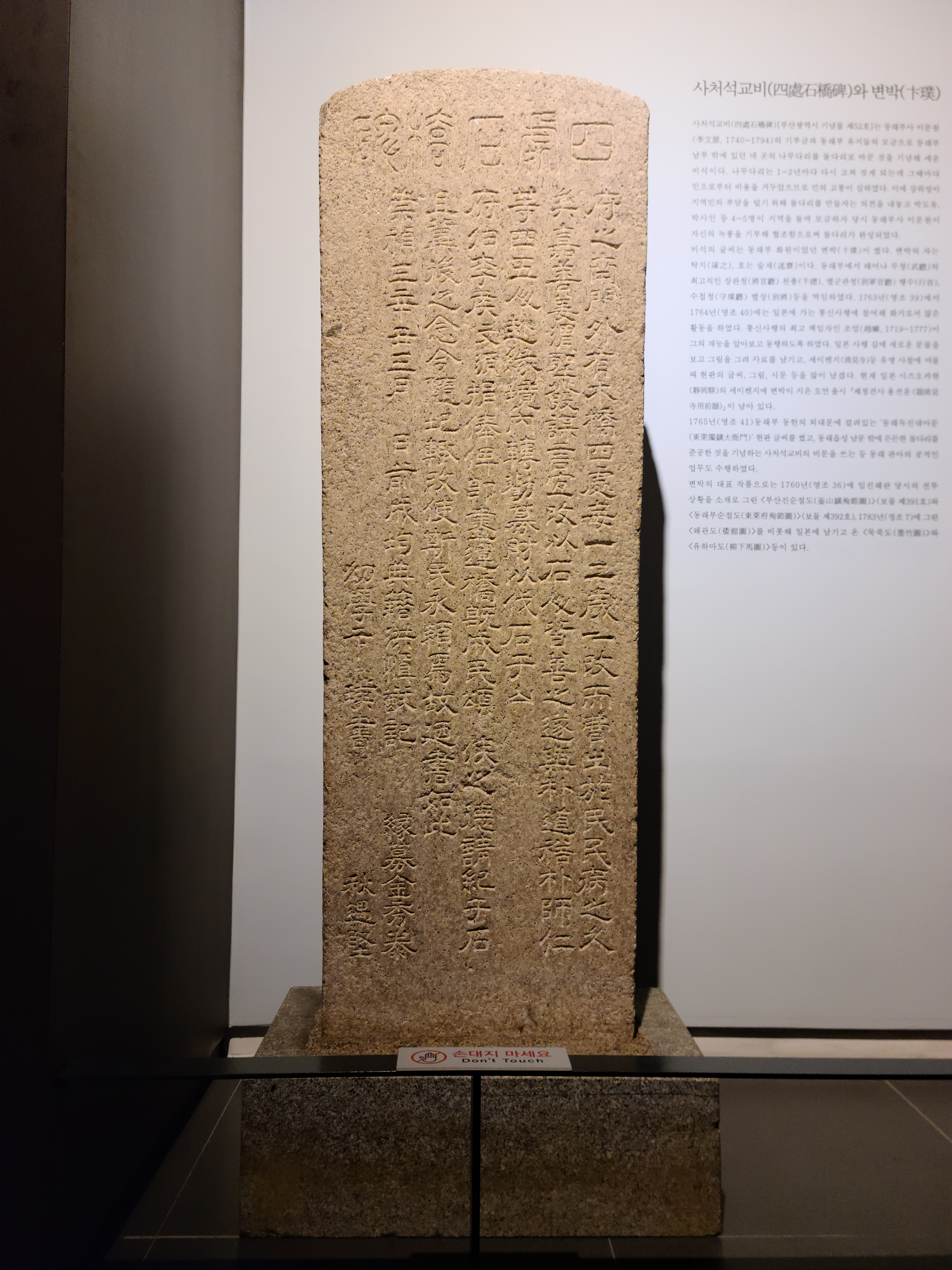
The Sacheon Seokgyo Stele (四處石橋碑), held by the Busan Museum, records the date as "the third Sinyu year after the Sungjeong era" (崇禎三辛丑), corresponding to 1781. It is designated as Busan Metropolitan City Monument No. 52.

- 崇禎紀元後再庚午 ('the second Gyeongo year after Sungjeonggiwon'; 1690)
- 崇禎後再癸丑 ('the second Gyuchuk year after the Sungjeong era'; 1733)
- 崇禎再紀後丙辰 ('the second Byeongjin year after the Sungjeong era'; 1736)
- 崇禎後三周壬申 ('the third Imshin year after the Sungjeong era'; 1752)
- 皇明崇禎紀元後三甲寅 ('the third Gapin year after Hwangmyeong Sungjeonggiwon'; 1794)
- 皇明紀元後四庚寅 ('the fourth Gyeongin year after Hwangmyeonggiwon'; 1834)
- 皇明紀元後四周甲午 ('the fourth Gap-o year after Hwangmyeonggiwon'; 1834)
- 崇禎紀元後四己未 ('the fourth Gimi year after Sungjeonggiwon'; 1859)
- 崇禎紀元後四乙丑 ('the fourth Eulchuk year after Sungjeonggiwon'; 1865)
- 崇禎紀元後五丙戌 ('the fifth Byeongsul year after Sungjeonggiwon'; 1886)
- 崇禎紀元後五壬辰 ('the fifth Imjin year after Sungjeonggiwon'; 1892)
- 崇禎後五甲寅 ('the fifth Gapin year after the Sungjeong era'; 1914)

=== Sexagenary cycle with or without ordinal numbers ===
戊辰後 ('after the Mujin year') refers to dates counted from the Mujin year, which was the first year of the Chongzhen era (1628)

- 崇禎紀元戊辰後丙辰 ('the Byeongjin year after the Mujin year of Sungjeonggiwon'; 1676)
- 崇禎紀元戊辰後五十一年戊午 ('the Muo year, the 51st year after the Mujin year of Sungjeonggiwon'; 1678)
- 崇禎紀元戊辰五十五年壬戌 ('the Imsul year, the 55th year after the Mujin year of Sungjeonggiwon'; 1682)
- 大明崇禎戊辰後丁亥 ('the Jeonghae year after the Mujin year of Daemyeong Sungjeong'; 1707)
- 皇明崇禎紀元戊辰之後一百三十三年庚辰 ('the Gyeongjin year, the 133rd year after the Mujin year of Hwangmyeong Sungjeonggiwon'; 1760)

丙子後 ('after the Byeongja year') refers to dates counted from the Byeongja year (1636), the year of the Qing invasion of Joseon (Byeongjahoran)

- 崇禎丙子後三十一年丙午 ('the Byeongo year, the 31st year after the Byeongja year of the Sungjeong era'; 1666)
- 崇禎丙子後三十五年庚戌 ('the Gyeongsul year, the 35th year after the Byeongja year of the Sungjeong era'; 1670)

甲申後 ('after the Gapsin year') refers to dates counted from the Gapsin year (1644), the year of the fall of the Ming dynasty and the establishment of Qing rule in China

- 崇禎十七年甲申後十六年己亥 ('the Gihae year, the 16th year after the Gapsin year of the 17th year of the Sungjeong era'; 1659)
- 崇禎甲申後四十年癸亥 ('the Gyehae year, the 40th year after the Gapsin year of the Sungjeong era'; 1683)
- 崇禎甲申後五十年 ('the 50th year after the Gapsin year of the Sungjeong era'; 1694)
- 崇禎甲申後六十三年丙戌 ('the Byeongsul year, the 63rd year after the Gapsin year of the Sungjeong era'; 1706)
- 崇禎甲申後六十五年 ('the 65th year after the Gapsin year of the Sungjeong era'; 1708)

再甲申後 ('after the second Gapsin year') refers to dates counted from the second Gapsin year (1704), which occurred 60 years after the first Gapsin year (1644)

- 崇禎再甲申後四十九年壬申 ('the Imsin year, the 49th year after the second Gapsin year of the Sungjeong era'; 1752)

=== Others ===
- 崇禎重光作噩 (1681)
- 崇禎紀元後四十二年丙寅 ('the Byeongin year, the 42nd year after Sungjeonggiwon'; 1686)
- 後崇禎四十六年庚午 ('the Gyeongo year, the 46th year after the Sungjeong era'; 1690)
- 崇禎丙午建祠後五十六年辛亥 ('the Sinhae year, the 56th year after the shrine was built in the Byeongo year of the Sungjeong era'; 1721)
- 崇禎紀年後再壬戌 ('the second Imsul year after Sungjeongginyeon'; 1742)
- 崇禎紀元後再庚辰 ('the second Gyeongjin year after Sungjeonggiwon'; 1760)
