= Jeju people =

Subgroup of Koreans

Jeju People
제주사름, 濟州人
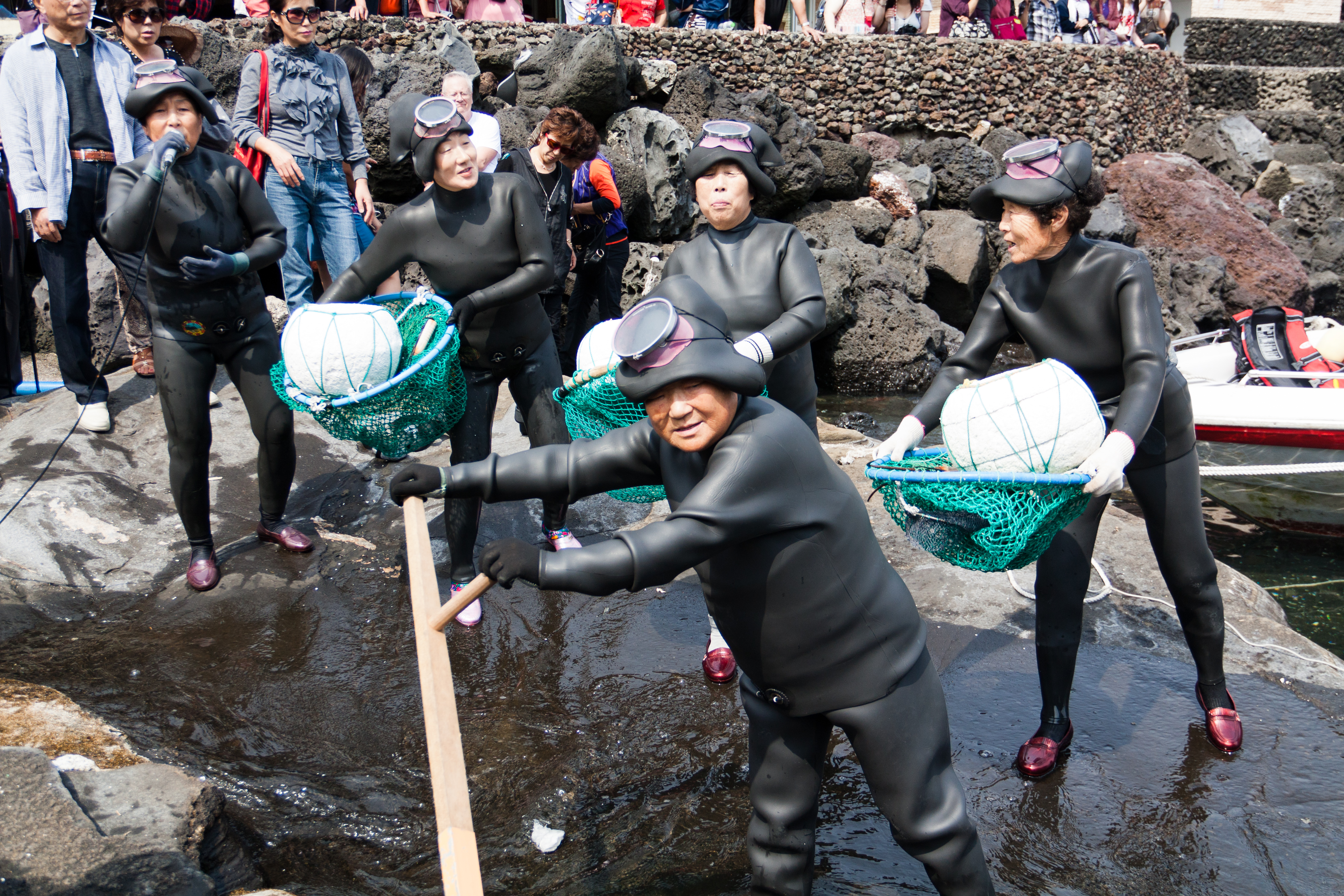
- Group of Jeju haenyo

Regions with significant populations
- Jeju Province: 600,000

Languages
- Korean (Pyojun-eo), Jeju

Religion
- Korean Shamanism, Buddhism, Christianity

Related ethnic groups
- Koreans

The Jeju people or Jejuans (Note: Jeju: 제주사름; Jeju RR: Jeju-sareum; Korean: 제주인; Hanja: 濟州人; RR: Jeju-in, also spelled Cheju people or Chejuans) are a subgroup of Koreans native to the Jeju Island, which is geographically located in the East China Sea. Administratively, they live in Jeju Province, excluding Chuja Islands, an autonomous self-governing province of South Korea.

Jejuans speak the Jeju language, which is considered to be one of the two branches of the Koreanic language family, as it has no mutual intelligibility with Standard Korean or any other Korean dialects in the Korean Peninsula. Jejuans also have unique cultural traditions that are distinct from mainland Koreans.

== History ==
=== Origins ===
Modern humans have lived on Jeju Island since the early Neolithic period (about 10,000 to 8,000 years ago). According to legend, three demi-gods emerged from Samseong, which is said to have been on the northern slopes of Hallasan and became the progenitors of the Jeju people, who founded the Kingdom of Tamna.

=== Tamna ===
There is no historical record of the founding or early history of Tamna.

After the establishment of Tamna, in the first century AD, Tamna people started active trade with Baekje and Silla on mainland Korea, Han China and Yayoi period Japan, Southeast Asia, and the Chola dynasty of South India. Later, Tamna became a tributary state of Baekje and Silla, and was subsequently annexed by Joseon.

=== Invasion of Goryeo ===
Tamna briefly reclaimed its independence after the fall of Silla in 935. However, it was subjugated by Goryeo in 938 and officially annexed in 1105. However, the kingdom maintained local autonomy until 1404, when Taejong of Joseon placed it under firm central control and brought the Tamna kingdom to an end. One interesting event that took place during these later years of Tamna was the Sambyeolcho Rebellion, which came to a bloody end on Jeju Island in 1274.

=== Japanese occupation ===
In 1910, Japan annexed Korea, including Jeju, inaugurating a period of hardship and deprivation for the islanders, many of whom were compelled to travel to the mainland or Japan for work. Residents of Jeju were active in the Korean independence movement during the period of Japanese rule.

=== After Korean independence ===
==== 1948 Jeju Massacre ====
On April 3, 1948, against a background of an ongoing ideological struggle for control of Korea and a variety of grievances held by islanders against the local authorities, the many communist sympathizers on the island attacked police stations and government offices. The brutal and often indiscriminate suppression of the leftist rebellion resulted in the massacre of tens of thousands of both villagers and communists, and the imprisonment of thousands more in internment camps.

In 2006, almost 60 years after the Jeju Uprising, the government of South Korea apologized for its role in the killings and promised reparations. In 2019, the South Korean police and defense ministry apologized for the first time over the massacres.

== Culture ==
Jejuans have a culture and language that are distinct from that of the Korean Peninsula. Jeju is also home to thousands of unique local legends. Perhaps the most distinct cultural artifact is the dol hareubang ("stone grandfather") carved from a block of basalt, found throughout the island.

=== Language ===
Jeju is the indigenous language of the Jejuans. UNESCO lists it as "critically endangered", with most of its speakers being elderly. The younger generation tends to speak Standard Korean due to the educational system enacted by the South Korean government, which does not allow Jejuan language schools, and has repressed its usage especially during the country's authoritarian era (e.g. under Syngman Rhee, Park Chung Hee and Chun Doo-hwan) up until the 1990s.

The South Korean government, including the National Institute of Korean Language and the country's Ministry of Education, continues to label Jeju language as a Korean dialect, specifically an "unintelligible Korean dialect", although it has no mutual intelligibility with Standard Korean or any other Korean dialects for that matter on the Korean Peninsula.

Ever since the 2000s, the majority of South Korean academic publications had switched to the term "Jeju language" rather than considering it as a dialect. The only English-language monograph on Jeju, published in 2019, consistently refers to it as a language as well. Among native speakers, the term Jeju-mal "Jeju speech" is most common.

=== Religion ===
Shamanism is a native religion of Jeju Island, and its teachings are mixed with Confucianism and Buddhism. Jeju Island is also one of the areas in which shamanism is most intact. Other religions practiced on Jeju Island include mainstream Buddhism and Christianity.

== Notable Jeju people ==
- Baekho (Real Name: Kang Dong-ho, 강동호; Hanja: 姜東昊), singer-songwriter, dancer, record producer, actor and K-pop idol, member of K-pop boy group NU'EST and its sub-unit NU'EST W
- Boo Seung-kwan (부승관; 夫勝寬), singer, dancer, and K-pop idol, member of the K-pop boy group Seventeen.
- Boo Suk-jong (부석종; 夫石鍾), South Korean Navy Admiral and Chief of Naval Operations of the Republic of Korea Navy (ROKN)
- Choi Jung Hwa (최정화; 崔正華), South Korean Taekwondo master and the son of Choi Hong Hi
- Choi Jungsook (최정숙; 崔貞淑), South Korean educator, doctor, the first woman principal in Jeju, the first woman superintendent in South Korea, and activist in the Korean independence movement and women's movement
- Gim Man-deok (김만덕; 金萬德), female merchant of Joseon
- Han Jae-rim (한재림), South Korean film director, screenwriter and film producer
- Hyun Ki-young (현기영), writer
- Hyun Kil-un (현길언), South Korean author
- Jeon Soo-jin (전수진), South Korean actress (Born in Seoul but raised in Jeju Island)
- Joy (Real Name: Park Soo-young, 박수영), singer-songwriter, rapper, dancer, actress, model, MC and K-pop idol, member of K-pop girl group Red Velvet
- Kaang Bong-Kiun (강봉균), South Korean professor
- Kang Chang-il (강창일), South Korean politician
- Kang Hye-ja (강혜자), South Korean sport shooter
- Kang Mun-sok (강문석), Korean socialist and activist during the Japanese occupation period
- Kim Dal-sam (김달삼), school teacher, leftist revolutionary and commander of Workers' Party of Korea troops during the Jeju uprising
- Kim Hee-ae (김희애), South Korean actress
- Kim Jin-hwan (김진환), singer, dancer, and K-pop idol, member of the K-pop boy group iKon
- Kim Nam-jin (김남진), South Korean actor
- Kim Si-hun (김시훈), singer, rapper, dancer, and K-pop idol, member of the K-pop boy group BDC
- Ko Young-hoon (고영훈), South Korean painter
- Liz (Real Name: Kim Ji-won, 김지원), singer, dancer, and K-pop idol, member of the K-pop girl group IVE
- Moon Myung-soon (문명순), South Korean politician
- Moon Chung-in (문정인), South Korean politician
- Moon Hee-kyung (문희경), South Korean actress
- O Muel (Real Name: Oh Kyung-heon, 오경헌), South Korean film director and screenwriter
- O Sonfa (Real Name: Oh Seon-hwa, 오선화), Zainichi Korean author and journalist
- Oh Young-hun (오영훈), South Korean politician
- Shaun Kim
- Soyou (Real Name: Kang Ji-hyun, 강지현), singer, dancer, model, MC and K-pop idol, former member of K-pop girl group Sistar
