= Tamna =

Former kingdom on Jeju Island, Korea

Tamna 耽羅 탐라
- ?–1404
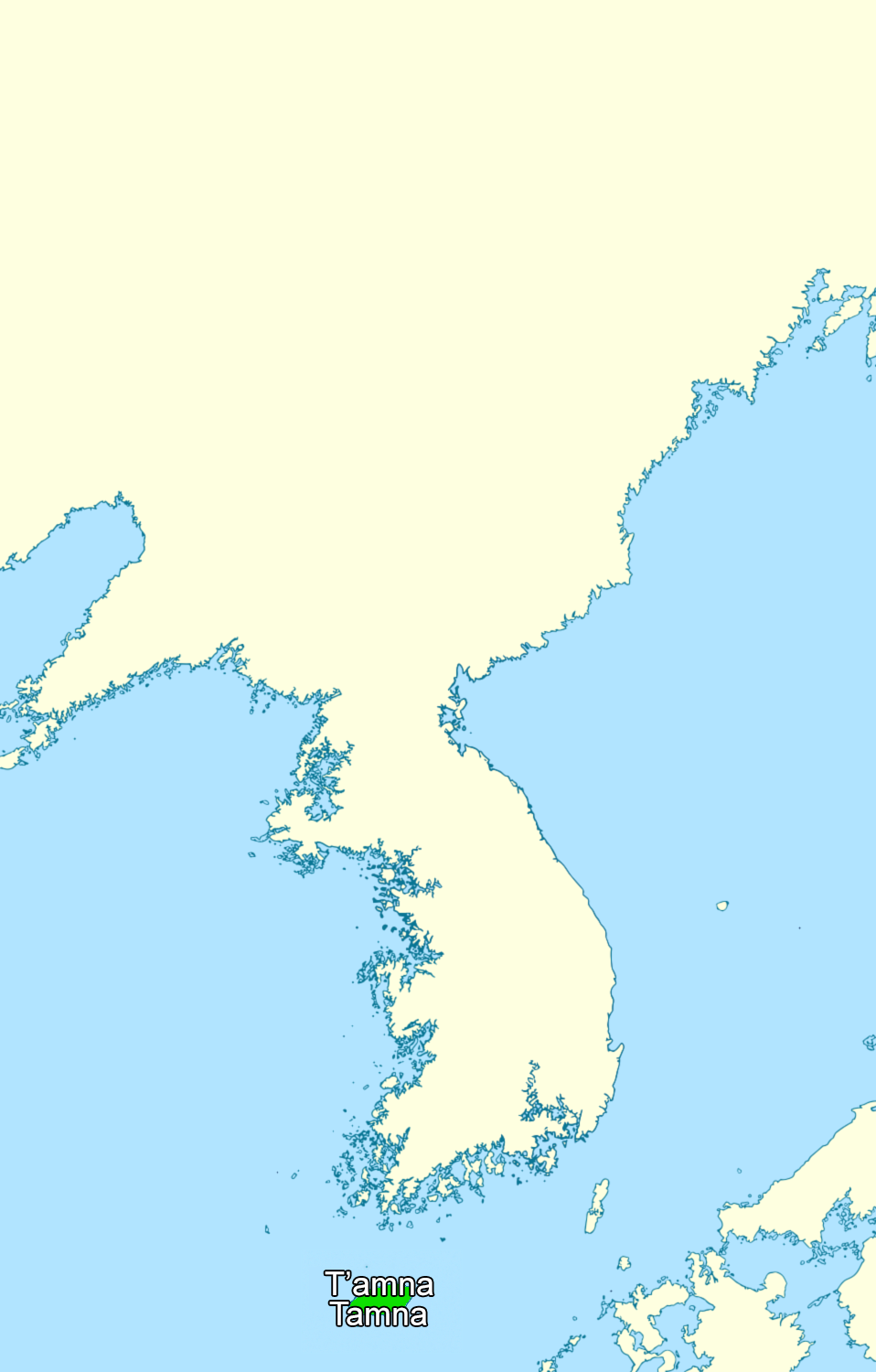
- Map of the approximate location of the Tamna kingdom
- Status: Independent state (?–498, 925–938); Tributary state of Baekje (498–660); Tributary state of Silla (662–925); Vassal state of Goryeo (938–1105); Local autonomous administration of Goryeo (1105–1275, 1301–1392); Local autonomous administration of Yuan dynasty as Tamna Prefecture (1275–1301); Local autonomous administration of Joseon (1392–1404)
- Capital: Mugeunseong (early); Jejuseong (later)
- Common languages: Tamna, Old Korean, Middle Korean, Japonic?
- Religion: Buddhism, Confucianism, Shamanism
- Demonym: Tamnan
- Government: Monarchy (?–938); Autonomous region (938–1404)
- King / Lord
- History
  - Establishment: ?
  - Fall: 1404
| Succeeded by |
| Joseon |

- Tamna
- Hangul: 탐라
- Hanja: 耽羅
- RR: Tamna
- MR: T'amna

Tamna (Korean: 탐라; Hanja: 耽羅) was a kingdom based on Jeju Island from ancient times until it was absorbed by the Korean Joseon dynasty in 1404, following a long period of being a tributary state or autonomous administrative region of various Korean kingdoms.

The Go (Jeju) clan is the family name of the Lord (Korean: 성주; Hanja: 星主; RR: Seongju; lit. 'star-lord'), that ruled West Tamna over 400 years. The Moon (Nampyeong) clan is the family name of the Prince (왕자; 王子; Wangja; lit. 'prince'), that ruled East Tamna for 400 years.

== Name ==
The Kingdom of Tamna is also sometimes known as Tangna (탕나), Seomna (섬나), and Tammora (탐모라). It's attested with the older 漱牟羅 /tammura/, which has been proposed to mean something like 'valley settlement' with the second component being possibly related to the Japonic homophone mura.

== History ==
=== Legends of founding ===
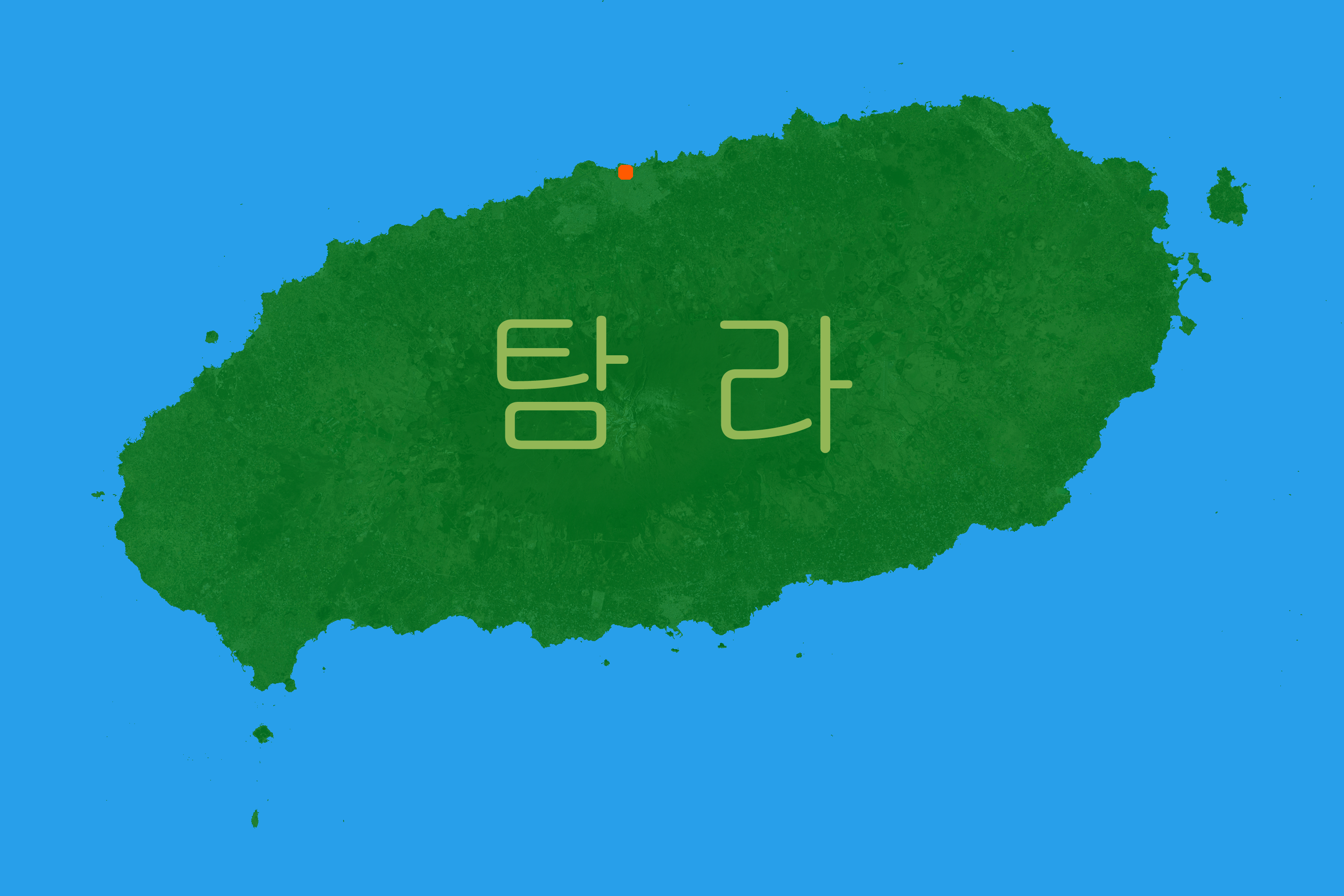
The red area signifies where the Seongjucheong was supposed to have been

There is no discovered historical record of the founding or early history of Tamna. One legend tells that the three divine founders of the country—Go (고), Yang (양), and Bu (부)—emerged from three holes in the ground in the 24th century BCE. These holes, known as the Samseonghyeol (삼성혈), are still preserved in Jeju City.

『初無人、三神人從地聳出其主山北麓有穴曰毛興、是其地也.長曰良乙那、次曰高乙那、三曰夫乙那、三人遊獵荒僻、皮衣肉食.一日、見紫泥封蔵木函、浮至東海濱、就而開之、函內又有石函.有一紅帶紫衣使者、隨來開函、有靑衣處女三人及諸駒犢五穀種、乃曰: 「我是日本國使也、吾王生此三女、云西海中嶽降神子三人、將欲開國而無配匹、於是命臣侍三女而來、宜作配以成大業.」使者忽乘雲而去、三人以年次分娶之.就泉甘土肥處射矢卜地、良乙那所居曰第一都、高乙那所居曰第二都、夫乙那所居曰第三都、始播五穀且牧駒犢、日就富庶.十五代孫高厚、高淸、高季昆弟三人、造船渡海、泊于耽津、蓋新羅盛時也.于時客星見南方、太史奏曰: 「異國人來朝之象也.」及厚等至、王嘉之、稱厚曰星主、以其動星象也.令淸出袴下、愛如己子、稱曰王子.又稱其季曰都內.邑號曰耽羅、以初來泊耽津而朝新羅也.各賜寶蓋・衣帶而遣之、自此子孫蕃盛、敬事新羅.以高爲星主、良爲王子、夫爲徒上.其後服事百濟、除星主・王子之號、以其爲佐平使者、爲恩率.及羅濟亡、耽羅國主見太子未老、朝高麗太祖、因賜星主・王子爵瑞山.』

"Ancient Jeju island was called Ying Prefecture and nobody lived there. Three gods, Yang Eul-na (양을나; 良乙那), Go Eul-na (고을나; 高乙那) and Bu Eul-na (부을나; 夫乙那) were appeared in Samsong hyeol (삼성혈; 三姓穴) at the south foot of Tanna mountain (탄나산; 漢拏山). And they were ancestor of people in Jeju island. One day, they were looking at Tanna mountain (탄나산; 漢拏山) and discovered a box that flowed from the North Sea. As they opened it, there were messenger, beautiful three princesses, farm animals and five grain seeds in the box. They came from eastern country, Japan. Three gods greeted them as their wives and started cultivating industries and five crops to make a village."

— Goryeosa, volume 57.

According to legend, after Yang Eul-na (양을나/良乙那) came to Jeju Island, a box washed up on the shore of the island. Yang Eul-na searched in the box and found three women, horses, cows, and agricultural seeds such as rice, corn, grain, millet, barley, and bamboo. From these beginnings, the three men established the kingdom of Tamna. He is regarded as the legendary ancestor of Yang Tang, the founder of the Jeju Yang bon-gwan.

=== Historical and archaeological records ===
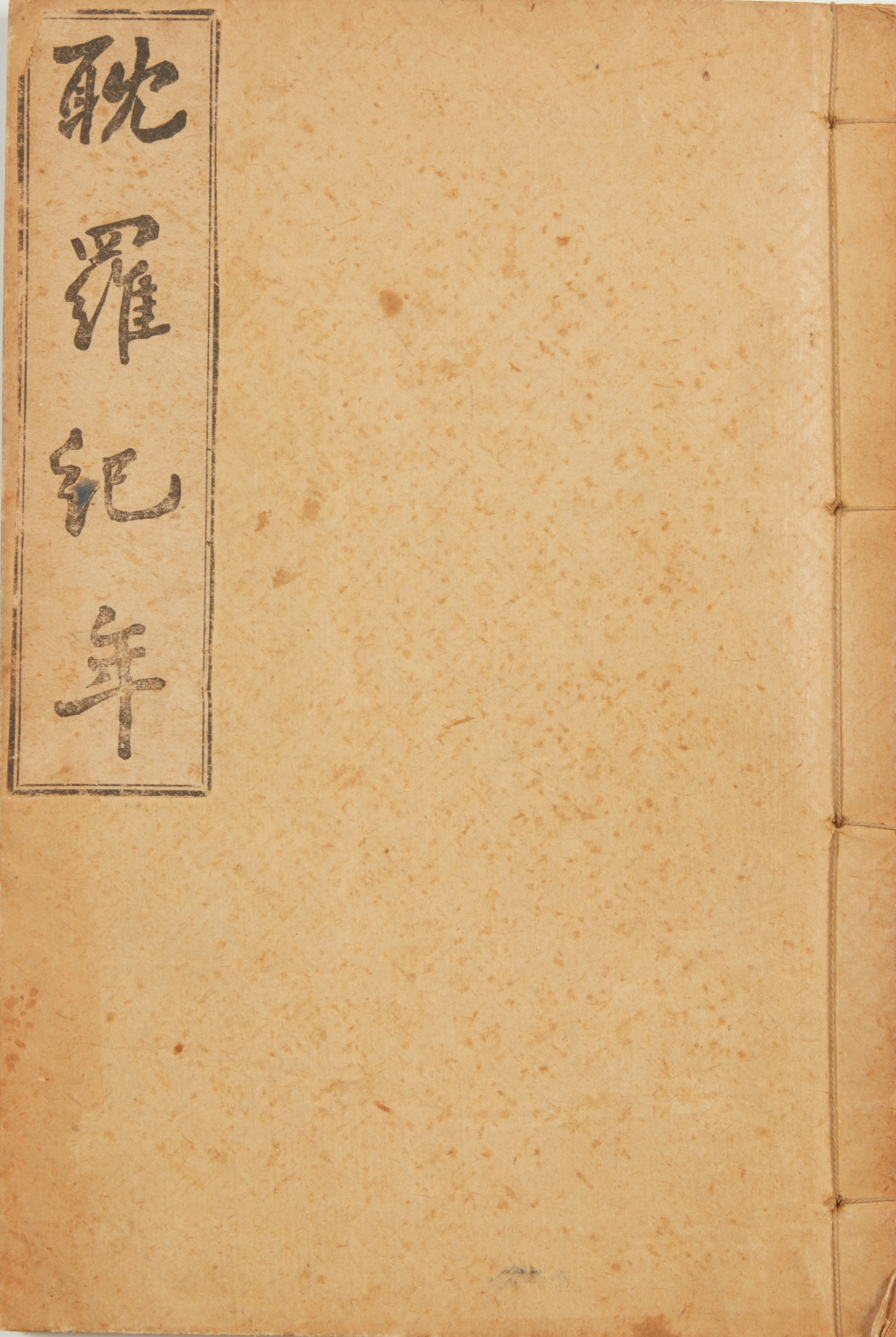
Tamna Ginyun, a history book written over 934 years, from the Goryeo Dynasty to the Joseon Dynasty

Archaeological evidence indicates that the people of Tamna were engaging in active trade with Han dynasty of China, Yayoi period of Japan, as well as Samhan period of Korea by the 1st century CE. The first historical reference to the kingdom may come in the 3rd century CE, in the chronicle of the Chinese Three Kingdoms period called the Sanguozhi. The Sanguozhi reports a strange people living on a large island near Korea, which it calls Juho (州胡, Late Han Chinese tɕu-ga, literally "island barbarians"). These people, who had a distinctive language and culture, engaged in trade with the Mahan people of the mainland. However, the identity of Juho with Tamna has been disputed by authorities such as the North Korean scholar Lee Ch'i-rin (이지린), who claims that Juho was a small island in the Yellow Sea.

In 476, according to the Samguk Sagi, Tamna entered into a tributary relationship with Baekje, which controlled the southwestern Korean Peninsula as Tamna gave military aide with some sort of money, and enjoyed strong ties with Japan. It was thus a natural partner for Tamna. As Baekje waned, Tamna turned to Silla instead. At some point near the end of the Three Kingdoms period, Tamna officially subjugated itself to Silla. Silla then conferred on the three princes of Tamna the titles which they would hold for the remainder of the kingdom's history: Seongju (성주, 星主), Wangja (왕자, 王子), and Donae (도내, 都內). Some sources indicate that this took place during the reign of King Munmu of Silla in the late 7th century CE.

Tamna briefly reclaimed its independence after the fall of Silla in 935. However, it was subjugated by the Goryeo dynasty in 938, and officially annexed in 1105. However, the kingdom maintained local autonomy until 1404, when Taejong of Joseon placed it under firm central control and brought the Tamna kingdom to an end. One interesting event that took place during these later years of Tamna was the Sambyeolcho Rebellion, which came to a bloody end on Jeju Island in 1274.

In 1402, Go Bong-rye, the last feudal lord, voluntarily relinquished his title of seongju to the king and received a governor position. Consequently, the governing system of Jeju Island finally changed to direct central rule.

== Rulers ==
=== Kings of Tamna ===
The Go clan is the family name of the kings that ruled Tamna, and the first king was one of the three who emerged from the ground. His descendants became the future kings of Tamna.

| # | Name | | Period of reign |
| # | Romanization | Hangul/Hanja | Period of reign |
|---|---|---|---|
| 1 | Go Eulna | 고을나왕 (高乙那王) | 2337–2206 BCE |
| 2 | Geon | 건왕 (建王) | 2206–1767 BCE |
| 3 | Samgye | 삼계왕 (三繼王) | 1767–1123 BCE |
| 4 | Ilmang | 일망왕 (日望王) | 1123–935 BCE |
| 5 | Doje | 도제왕 (島濟王) | 935–771 BCE |
| 6 | Eon-gyeong | 언경왕 (彦卿王) | 771–619 BCE |
| 7 | Bomyeong | 보명왕 (寶明王) | 610–520 BCE |
| 8 | Haengcheon | 행천왕 (幸天王) | 520–426 BCE |
| 9 | Hwan | 환왕 (歡王) | 426–315 BCE |
| 10 | Sik | 식왕 (湜王) | 315–247 BCE |
| 11 | Uk | 욱왕 (煜王) | 247–207 BCE |
| 12 | Hwang | 황왕 (惶王) | 207–157 BCE |
| 13 | Wi | 위왕 (偉王) | 157–105 BCE |
| 14 | Yeong | 영왕 (榮王) | 105–58 BCE |
| 15 | Hu | 후왕 (厚王) | 58–7 BCE |
| 16 | Dumyeong | 두명왕 (斗明王) | 7 BCE–43 CE |
| 17 | Seonju | 선주왕 (善主王) | 43–93 |
| 18 | Jinam | 지남왕 (知南王) | 93–144 |
| 19 | Seongbang | 성방왕 (聖邦王) | 144–195 |
| 20 | Munseong | 문성왕 (文星王) | 195–243 |
| 21 | Ik | 익왕 (翼王) | 243–293 |
| 22 | Jihyo | 지효왕 (之孝王) | 293–343 |
| 23 | Suk | 숙왕 (淑王) | 343–393 |
| 24 | Hyeonbang | 현방왕 (賢方王) | 393–423 |
| 25 | Gi | 기왕 (璣王) | 423–453 |
| 26 | Dam | 담왕 (聃王) | 453–483 |
| 27 | Jiun | 지운왕 (指雲王) | 483–508 |
| 28 | Seo | 서왕 (瑞王) | 508–533 |
| 29 | Damyeong | 다명왕 (多鳴王) | 533–558 |
| 30 | Dam | 담왕 (談王) | 558–583 |
| 31 | Cheseam | 체삼왕 (體參王) | 583–608 |
| 32 | Seongjin | 성진왕 (聲振王) | 608–633 |
| 33 | Hong | 홍왕 (鴻王) | 633–658 |
| 34 | Cheoryang | 처량왕 (處良王) | 658–683 |
| 35 | Won | 원왕 (遠王) | 683–708 |
| 36 | Pyoryun | 표륜왕 (表倫王) | 708–733 |
| 37 | Hyeong | 형왕 (逈王) | 733–758 |
| 38 | Chido | 치도왕 (致道王) | 758–783 |
| 39 | Uk | 욱왕 (勖王) | 783–808 |
| 40 | Cheonwon | 천원왕 (天元王) | 808–833 |
| 41 | Hogong | 호공왕 (好恭王) | 833–858 |
| 42 | So | 소왕 (昭王) | 858–883 |
| 43 | Gyeongjik | 경직왕 (敬直王) | 883–908 |
| 44 | Min | 민왕 (岷王) | 908–933 |
| 45 | Jagyeon | 자견왕 (自堅王) | 933–938 |

=== Lords and governors of West Tamna ===
The Go (Jeju) clan is the family name of the Lord (Seongju, 성주, 星主), that ruled West Tamna.

| # | Name | | Period of reign |
| # | Surname/First Name | Position(Hangul/Hanja) | Period of reign |
|---|---|---|---|
| 1 | Go/Malro(고말로) | Lord(성주/星主) | 938–1024 |
| 2 | Go/Jumul(고주물) | Lord(성주/星主) | 1024–1029 |
| 3 | Go/Ohno(고오노) | Lord(성주/星主) | 1029–1063 |
| 4 | Go/Eil(고일) | Lord(성주/星主) | 1063–1090 |
| 5 | Go/Bokryeong(고복령) | Lord(성주/星主) | 1090–1101 |
| 6 | Go/Indan(고인단) | Lord(성주/星主) | ?-? |
| 7 | Go/Boksu(고복수) | Lord(성주/星主) | ?-? |
| 8 | Go/Silgae(고실개) | Lord(성주/星主) | ?-? |
West Tamna ruled by Go(Jeju) Clan for 400 years
| ? | Go/Bongre(고봉례) | Lord(성주/星主) Governor of Left Jeju (좌도지관/左都知管) | ?-1411 |
| ? | Go/Sangon(고상온) | Governor of Left Jeju (좌도지관/左都知管) | 1411–1412 |
| ? | Go/Chungun(고충언) | Governor of Left Jeju (좌도지관/左都知管) | 1412–1415 |
| ? | Public official of Joseon Kingdom | Governor of Left Jeju (좌도지관/左都知管) | 1415–1445 |

*Based on Tamnaji(탐라지, 耽羅志), Goryeosa(고려사, 高麗史) and The Veritable Records of Joseon Dynasty (조선왕조실록, 朝鮮王朝實錄)

=== Princes and governors of East Tamna ===
The Moon (Nampyeong) clan is the family name of the Prince (Wangja, 왕자, 王子), that ruled East Tamna.

| # | Name | | Period of reign |
| # | Surname/First Name | Position(Hangul/Hanja) | Period of reign |
|---|---|---|---|
| 1 | ?/Dura(?두라) | Prince(왕자, 王子) | ?-1043 |
| 2 | ?/Hoin(?호인) | Prince(왕자, 王子) | 1043–1053 |
| 3 | ?/Suwunna(?수운나) | Prince(왕자, 王子) | 1053–1063 |
| 4 | Moon/Chak (문착) | Prince(왕자, 王子) | ?-? |
| 5 | Moon/Yang-Vu (문양부) | Prince(왕자, 王子) | ?-? |
| 6 | Moon/Young-hee (문영희) | Prince(왕자, 王子) | ?-? |
| 7 | Moon/Shin (문신) | Prince(왕자, 王子) | ?-? |
| 8 | Moon/Chang-woo (문창우) | Prince(왕자, 王子) | ?-? |
| 9 | Moon/Chang-yu (문창유) | Prince(왕자, 王子), Lord(성주, 星主,출처:연려실기술) | ?-? |
| 10 | Moon/Gong-jae (문공제) | Prince(왕자, 王子) | ?-? |
| 11 | Moon/Seung-seou (문승서) | Prince(왕자, 王子) | ?-? |
| 12 | Moon/Shin-vou (문신보) | Prince(왕자, 王子) | ?-? |
| 13 | Moon/Chung-vou (문충보) | Prince(왕자, 王子) | ?-? |
| 14 | Moon/Chung-gul (문충걸) | Prince(왕자, 王子) | ?-? |
| Last Prince | Moon/Chung-sae (문충세) | Prince(왕자, 王子) Governor of Right Jeju (우도지관/右都知管) | ?-1404 1404–1415 |
East Tamna ruled by Moon(Nampyeong) Clan for 400 years
| ? | Public official of Joseon Kingdom | Governor of Right Jeju (우도지관/右都知管) | 1415–1445 |

*Based on Tamnaji(탐라지, 耽羅志), Goryeosa(고려사, 高麗史) and The Veritable Records of Joseon Dynasty (조선왕조실록, 朝鮮王朝實錄)

== Language ==
Tamna
- Old Jeju
- Native to: Tamna
- Ethnicity: Tamnans
- Era: 6th-? century AD
- Language family: Japonic?: Insular Japonic?; Japanese?; Tamna
- Early forms: Proto-Japonic?: Old Japanese?

Language codes
- ISO 639-3: None (mis)
- Glottolog: None

The Tamna language might have been Japonic in origin, later being replaced by a Koreanic language. Alexander Vovin compares certain glosses of Jeju Japonic to words of other Japonic languages.

Comparison of Japonic and Jeju Japonic
| English | Old Japanese | Proto-Ryukyuan | Proto-Japonic | Jeju Japonic |
|---|---|---|---|---|
| mouth | kuti ~ kutu- | *kuti | *kutuy | kulle |
| deity | kamï ~ kamu- | *kami | *kamuy | kam- |
| people | tami | -- | *tamV | tam- |
| village | mura | *mura | *mura | -mura |

Vovin (2013) notes that the old name for Jeju Island is tammura, which can be analyzed in Japanese as tani mura たにむら (谷村 'valley settlement') or tami mura たみむら (民村 'people's settlement'). Thus, Vovin concludes that Japonic speakers were present on Jeju Island before being replaced by Koreanic speakers sometime before the 15th century.

== See also ==
- History of Korea
- Three Kingdoms of Korea

== Bibliography ==
- Vovin, Alexander (2017). "Origins of the Japanese Language". Oxford Research Encyclopedia of Linguistics. Archived from the original on 17 January 2023.
