= Capital of Korea =

History of national capitals of Korea

Korea, a peninsula in East Asia, has had a number of capitals. The peninsula is currently divided into two countries: North Korea, whose capital is Pyongyang, and South Korea, whose capital is Seoul.

== During Gojoseon ==
Gojoseon:

- Asadal — (legend, unknown)
- Wanggeom (modern Pyongyang) — Second capital (post 400 BCE)

== During the Three Kingdoms of Korea ==
Three Kingdoms of Korea:

- Jolbon — first capital of Goguryeo (37 BCE — 3 CE)
- Gungnae City — second capital of Goguryeo (3 — 427 CE)
- Pyongyang — third capital of Goguryeo (427 — 668 CE)
- Wiryeseong (modern Seoul) — first capital of Baekje (18 BCE — 475 CE)
- Ungjin (modern Gongju) — second capital of Baekje (476 — 538 CE)
- Sabi (modern Buyeo County) — third capital of Baekje (538 — 660 CE)
- Gyeongju — capital of Silla (57 — 935 CE)

== During the North–South States Period ==
North–South States Period:

- Gyeongju — capital of Silla (57 BCE — 935 CE)
- Dongmo Mountain — first capital of Balhae (698 — 742 CE)
- Junggyeong — second capital of Balhae (742 — 756 CE)
- Sanggyeong — third capital of Balhae (756 — 785 CE, 793 — 926 CE)

== During the Later Three Kingdoms ==
Later Three Kingdoms:

- Gyeongju — capital of Silla (57 BCE — 935 CE)
- Wansanju (modern Jeonju) — capital of Later Baekje (892 — 936 CE)
- Songak (modern Kaesong) — first capital of Taebong (901 — 905 CE)
- Cheorwon (modern Cheorwon County) — second capital of Taebong (905 — 918 CE)

== During Goryeo ==
Goryeo

- Gaegyeong (modern Kaesong)

== During Joseon ==
Joseon and Korean Empire

- Hanseong (Seoul)

== Modern capitals ==
- Seoul — capital of South Korea a.k.a. Republic of Korea (ROK) (Note: Between 1948 and 1972, Seoul was also the de jure capital of the Democratic People's Republic of Korea (North Korea).)
- Pyongyang — capital of North Korea a.k.a. Democratic People's Republic of Korea (DPRK)
