= List of era names of the Ming dynasty =

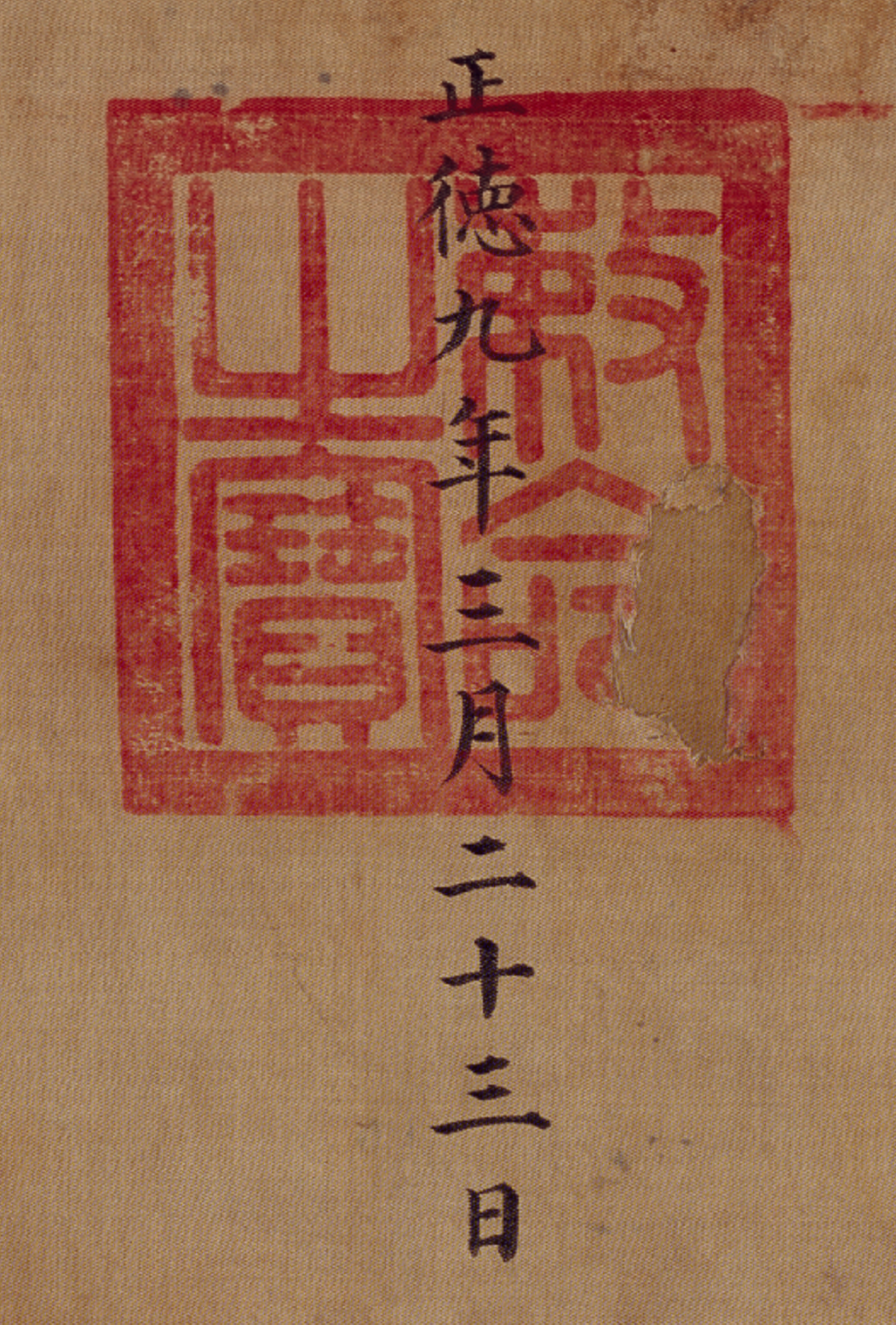
An edict from the Ming dynasty concludes with the date "the twenty-third day of the third month of the ninth year of the Zhengde era" (正德九年三月二十三日). "Zhengde" was the era name used during the reign of the Zhengde Emperor (1506–1521).

The Ming dynasty was an imperial dynasty that ruled over China proper from 1368 to 1644 during the late imperial era of China (960–1912). The dynasty was founded by the Hongwu Emperor, who successfully led a rebellion against the Mongol-led Yuan dynasty, forcing the last Yuan emperor to flee China proper. After 276 years of rule, the Ming fell in 1644 when a rebel army led by Li Zicheng captured its primary capital, Beijing. Li subsequently established the Shun dynasty but was in turn defeated by the Manchu-led Qing dynasty, which occupied northern China in the same year. Although they lost control of the north, members of the Ming imperial family—collectively known as the Southern Ming—continued to rule over southern China but were gradually pushed back by the Manchus until the last emperor, the Yongli Emperor, was executed in 1662 in Burma.

The Ming dynasty continued the use of era names, a system introduced by Emperor Wu of Han in 114 BC, or more formally in 110 BC. An era name (年號; Niánhào), or "reign motto", was chosen at the beginning of an emperor's reign to reflect the political, economic, or social conditions of the time. During the Ming dynasty, with the exception of Emperor Yingzong, who had two separate reigns, each emperor used only one era name throughout his reign, (Note: The tradition was later continued by the Qing dynasty and became known as "one reign, one era name" system (一世一元 or 一帝一年號).) whereas emperors of earlier dynasties often adopted multiple era names. (Note: For example, Emperor Wu of Han reigned for 54 years (140–87 BC), using 11 era names; Emperor Hui of Jin reigned for 17 years (290–306), using 11 era names; Emperor Gaozong of Tang reigned for 35 years (649–683), using 14 era names; and Wu Zetian reigned for 21 years (684–704), using 18 era names.) As a result, Ming emperors are commonly referred to by their era names.

The Ming had a total of 17 era names. The first, Hongwu, was inaugurated by the Hongwu Emperor in 1368, while the last, Chongzhen, ended when the Chongzhen Emperor committed suicide during the fall of Beijing in 1644. The longest-used era name was Wanli, lasting 48 years, while the shortest was Taichang, which succeeded Wanli and lasted only about four months.

The Southern Ming continued the use of era names, employing four in total: Hongguang, Longwu, Shaowu, and Yongli. The longest-lasting was Yongli, which endured for 16 years, while the shortest was Hongguang, lasting only five months; Shaowu, by contrast, was never effectively implemented.

In the Ming dynasty, a few days usually separated each emperor's reign. When a Ming emperor died, there was a period of mourning, after which their successor was crowned as soon a "propitious" day was chosen. Emperors reigned in their predecessor's era name until a new era name was declared at the beginning of the next year.

Foreign tributary states of the Ming dynasty, such as Joseon and the Ryukyu Kingdom, also adopted and used Ming era names. Following the Qing invasion of Joseon in 1637, Joseon was forced to submit to the Qing dynasty and officially followed the Qing calendar, but secretly continued to use the Chongzhen era name to express its loyalty to the Ming and opposition to the Qing.

== List ==
=== Ming dynasty ===
Ming dynasty (1368–1644)
Era name	Period of use	Length of use	Sovereign	Meaning	Derived from (Note: Identifies the textual or conceptual source from which the era name is drawn; where no specific source is attested, the entry is indicated by shading)	Remark
Hongwu 洪武	1368–1398	31 years	Hongwu Emperor	Vastly Martial	—N/a	Usage continued by the Jianwen Emperor upon his ascension to the throne. Usage later restored during the reign of the Yongle Emperor.
Jianwen 建文	1399–1402	4 years	Jianwen Emperor	Establishing Civility	—N/a	The Jianwen Emperor was overthrown by his uncle, the Yongle Emperor, during the Jingnan campaign. He abolished the Jianwen Emperor's reforms and declared his reign illegitimate, thereby abolishing the Jianwen era and extending the Hongwu era to 1402. It was not until 1595 that the Jianwen Emperor's era and imperial title were restored by the Wanli Emperor.
Yongle 永樂	1403–1424	22 years	Yongle Emperor	Perpetual Happiness	—N/a	Initially designated as "Yongqing" (永清), the era name was later changed to "Yongle". Usage continued by the Hongxi Emperor upon his ascension to the throne.
Hongxi 洪熙	1425	1 year	Hongxi Emperor	Vastly Prosperous	—N/a	Usage continued by the Xuande Emperor upon his ascension to the throne
Xuande 宣德	1426–1435	10 years	Xuande Emperor	Proclamation of Virtue	—N/a	Usage continued by Emperor Yingzong upon his ascension to the throne
Zhengtong 正統	1436–1449	14 years	Emperor Yingzong	Proper Reign	—N/a	Usage continued by the Jingtai Emperor upon his ascension to the throne
Jingtai 景泰	1450–1457	7 years	Jingtai Emperor	Peaceful Fortune	—N/a	After the Jingtai Emperor was deposed in a palace coup in 1457, Emperor Yingzong—who had been captured by the Oirat Mongols in 1449 during the Tumu Crisis and placed under house arrest after returning to Beijing in 1450—was restored to the throne and proclaimed a new era, Tianshun.
Tianshun 天順	1457–1464	8 years	Emperor Yingzong	Conforming to Heavenly Plan	—N/a	Usage continued by the Chenghua Emperor upon his ascension to the throne
Chenghua 成化	1465–1487	23 years	Chenghua Emperor	Accomplishing Civilization	Wenzi	Usage continued by the Hongzhi Emperor upon his ascension to the throne
Hongzhi 弘治	1488–1505	18 years	Hongzhi Emperor	Great Governance	—N/a	Usage continued by the Zhengde Emperor upon his ascension to the throne
Zhengde 正德	1506–1521	16 years	Zhengde Emperor	Rectification of Virtue	Book of Documents, Correct Interpretation of the Book of Documents	Usage continued by the Jiajing Emperor upon his ascension to the throne
Jiajing 嘉靖	1522–1566	45 years	Jiajing Emperor	Admirable Tranquility	Book of Documents	According to Liechao nianhao bianwu, after the Jiajing Emperor ascended the throne, the court proposed three possible era names: Shaozhi (紹治), Mingliang (明良), and Jiajing. "Shaozhi" implied continuing the governance of the Hongzhi era—that is, carrying on the "Hongzhi Restoration" and eliminating the maladministration of the Zhengde Emperor's reign. The Jiajing Emperor, however, chose "Jiajing" as his era name instead of the widely favored "Shaozhi". This choice was intended to signal that his accession to the throne represented dynastic continuity rather than direct filial succession.
Longqing 隆慶	1567–1572	6 years	Longqing Emperor	Great Celebration	—N/a	Usage continued by the Wanli Emperor upon his ascension to the throne
Wanli 萬曆	1573–1620	48 years	Wanli Emperor	Longest Reign	—N/a	The longest-used era name of the Ming
Taichang 泰昌	1620	4 months	Taichang Emperor	Grand Prosperity	—N/a	In the seventh month of the forty-eighth year of the Wanli era, the Wanli Emperor died. In the eighth month, the Taichang Emperor ascended the throne, but died only one month later. In the ninth month, the Tianqi Emperor succeeded to the throne and decreed that the period from the eighth to the twelfth month of Wanli 48 would be designated as the first year of the Taichang era. Therefore, the forty-eighth year of the Wanli era and the first year of the Taichang era fell within the same year.
Tianqi 天啟	1621–1627	7 years	Tianqi Emperor	Heavenly Inspiration	Zuo Zhuan	Usage continued by the Chongzhen Emperor upon his ascension to the throne
Chongzhen 崇禎	1628–1644	17 years	Chongzhen Emperor	Honorable and Auspicious	—N/a	Siling dianliji states that when the Chongzhen Emperor ascended the throne, the court proposed four possible era names: Qiansheng (乾聖), Xingfu (興福), Xianjia (咸嘉), and Chongzhen (崇貞). He ultimately chose "Chongzhen" as the era name and further altered the character zhen from 貞 to 禎. Liehuang xiaoshi, however, records that the proposed era names were Yongchang (永昌), Shaoqing (紹慶), Xianjia, and Chongzhen. In the end, "Chongzhen" was selected because it is a homophone of "revival" (chongzhen, 重振).

=== Southern Ming ===
Southern Ming (1644–1662)
Era name	Period of use	Length of use	Sovereign	Meaning	Remark
Hongguang 弘光	1645	5 months	Hongguang Emperor	Great Light	Usage continued by the Longwu Emperor upon his ascension to the throne
Longwu 隆武	1645–1646	2 years	Longwu Emperor	Plentiful and Martial	Usage continued under the Shaowu and Yongli emperors upon their accession to the throne
Shaowu 紹武	—N/a		Shaowu Emperor	Continuation of War	Originally planned to supersede the Longwu era in 1647, the era name was never put into effect because the Shaowu Emperor's reign ended beforehand.
Yongli 永曆	1647–1662	16 years	Yongli Emperor	Perpetual Calendar	Usage continued by the Ming loyalist Kingdom of Tungning until 1683
