= Jeju-mok Government Office =

Former government complex in Jeju City, South Korea

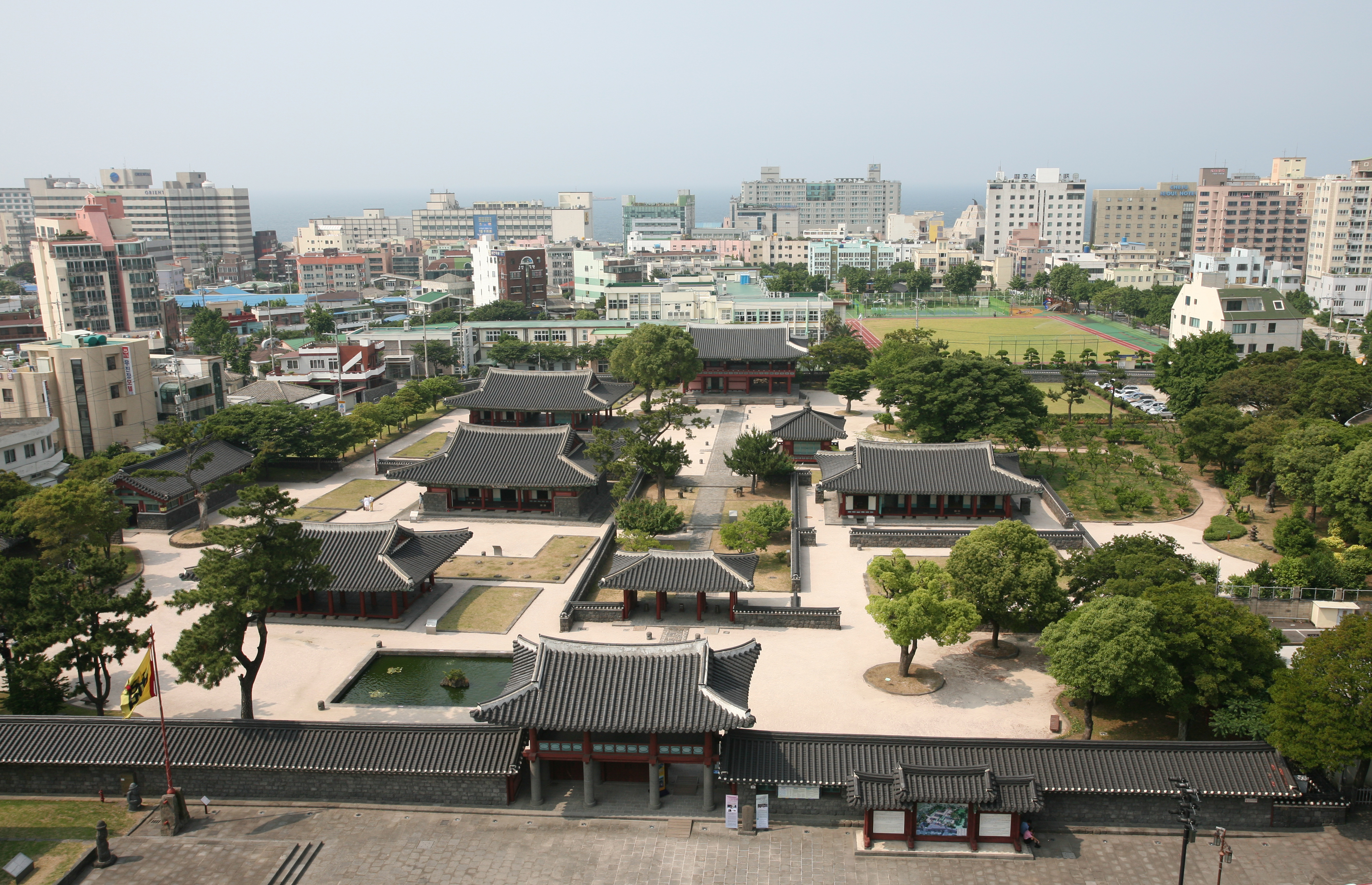
- View of the complex from above
- Interactive map of Jeju-mok Government Office
- 33.5138°N 126.5219°E
- Location: Jeju City, Jeju Province, South Korea

Historic Sites of South Korea
- Official name: Jeju-mok Government Office
- Designated: 1993-03-31
- Reference no.: 380

Korean name
- Hangul: 제주목 관아
- Hanja: 濟州牧官衙
- RR: Jejumok gwana
- MR: Chejumok kwana

Jeju-mok Government Office (Korean: 제주목 관아; Hanja: 濟州牧官衙) was the Tamna and Joseon–era administrative complex for Jeju Island. The former complex is now a Historic Site of South Korea.

== Description ==
The area was used as Jeju's administrative center for many centuries. During the 1910 to 1945 Japanese colonial period, the complex was completely demolished under the colonial government. The former site was excavated from 1991 to 1998. It was designated a Historic Site of South Korea in 1993. The site was recreated to its precolonial appearance based on historical and archaeological research. Restoration work was completed in 2002.

== Gallery ==
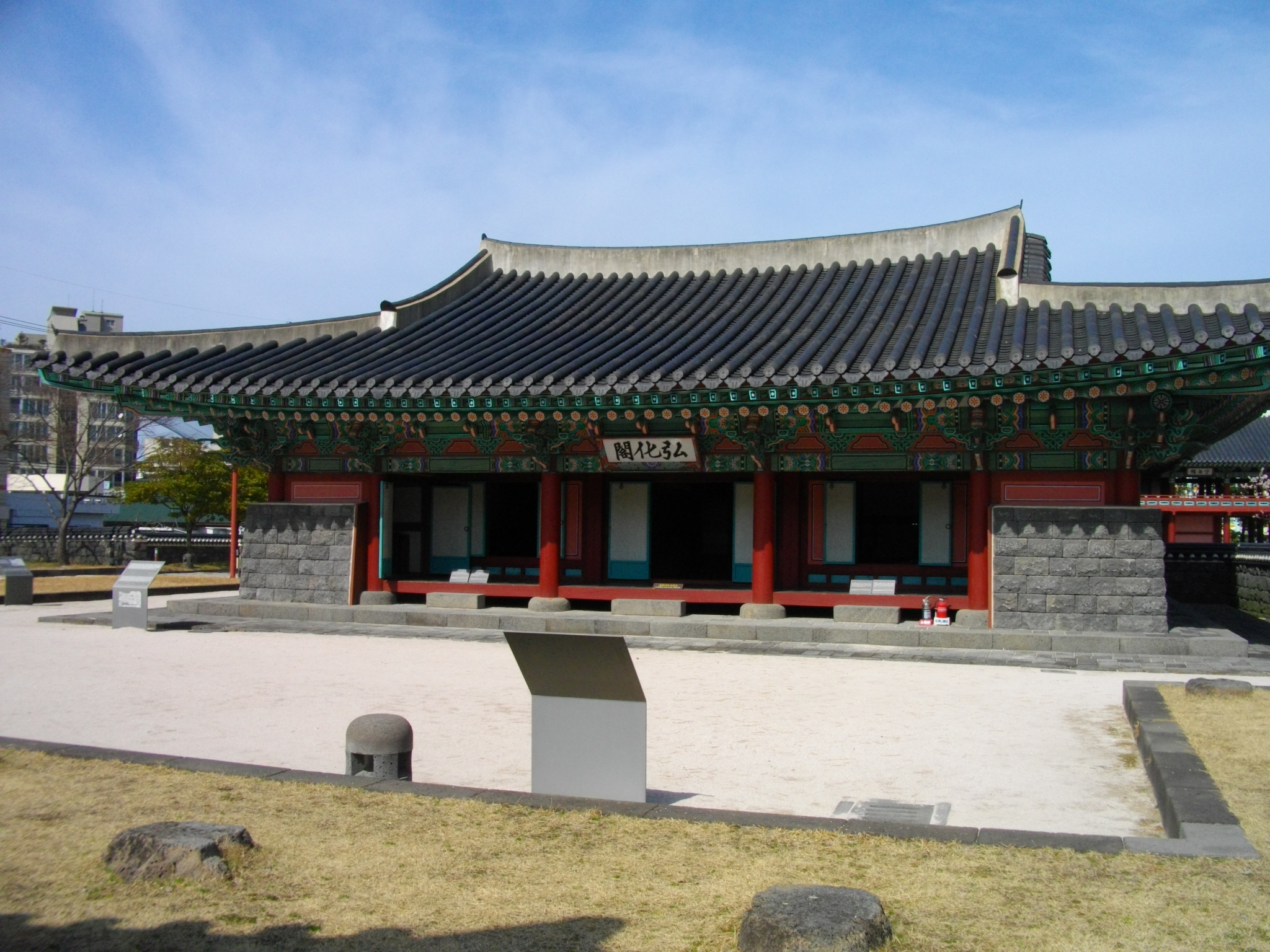
The building Honghwagak in the complex (2014)

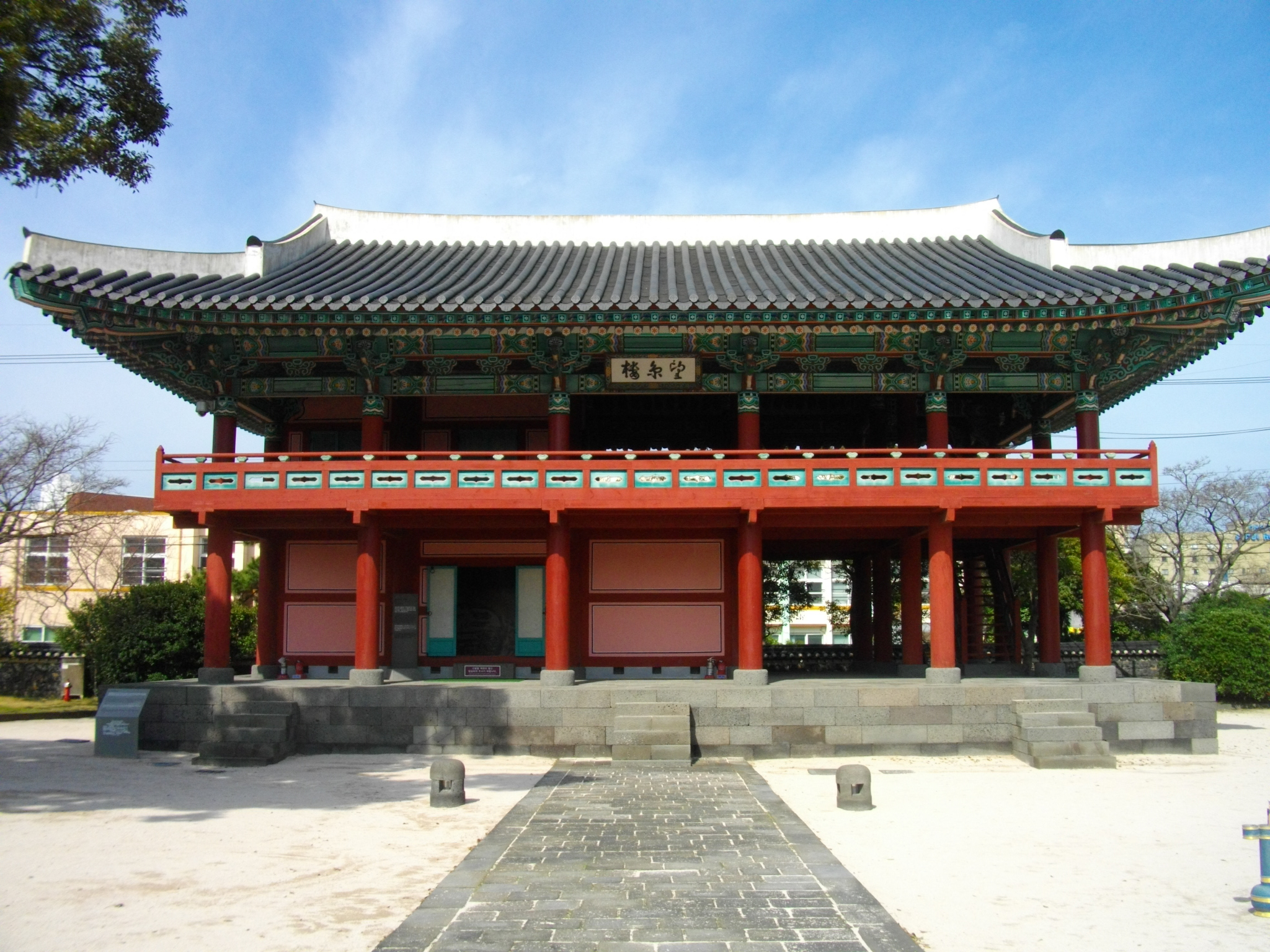
The building Manggyeongnu (2014)

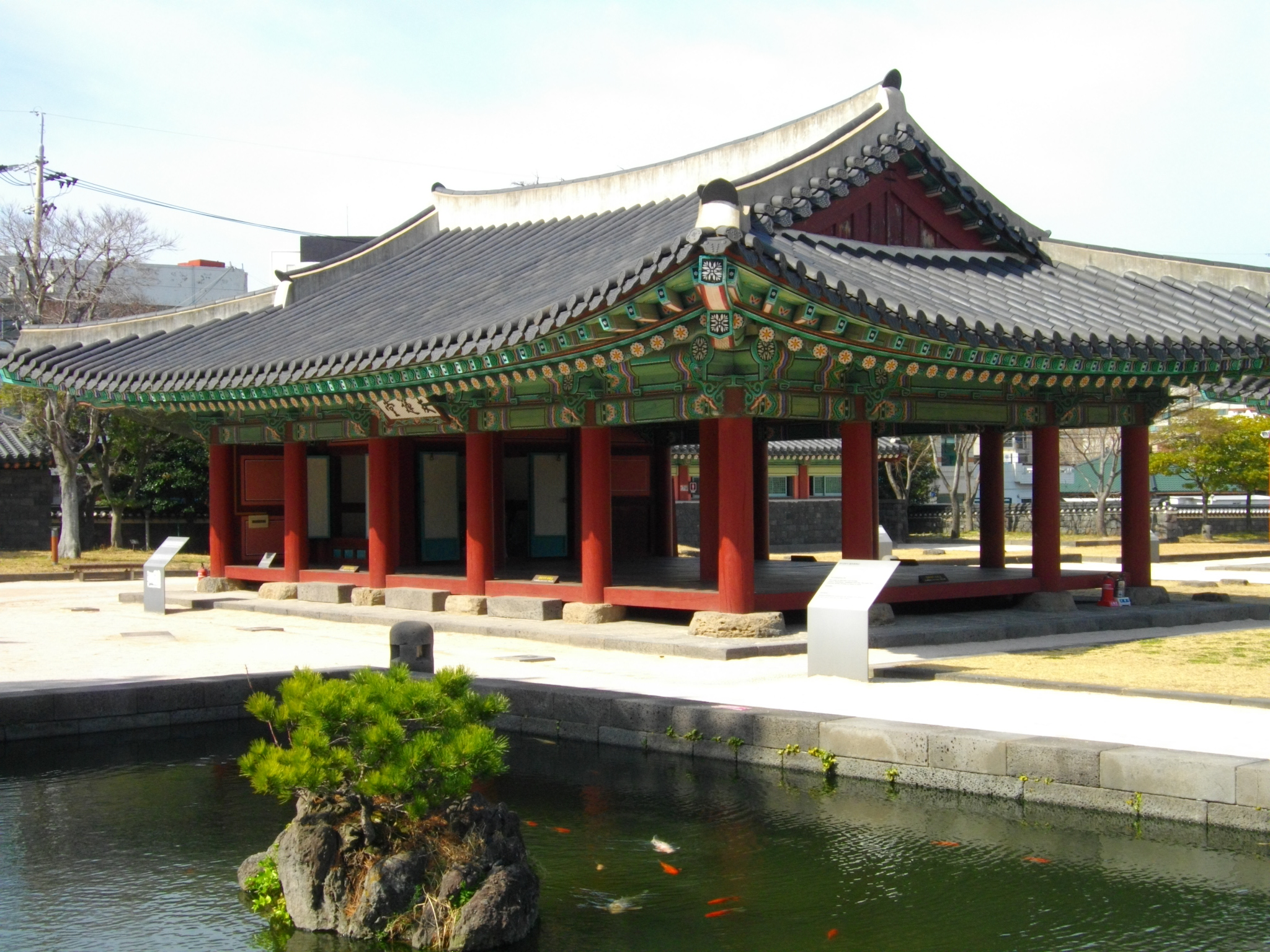
The building Uryeondang (2014)
