= Choi Jungsook =

Korean activist (1902–1977)

- Hangul: 최정숙
- Hanja: 崔貞淑
- RR: Choe Jeongsuk
- MR: Ch'oe Chŏngsuk

Choi Jungsook (Korean: 최정숙; 10 February 1902 – 23 February 1977) was an activist in the Korean independence movement and women's movement. She was also an educator, a doctor, the first woman principal in Jeju, and the first woman superintendent in South Korea. Through her achievements, she was conferred a decoration by the Pope and she was honored with 516 national awards. She was a woman who devoted herself to education, public welfare, and medicine of her hometown and country.

== Early life and education ==
Choi was born as the first daughter of Choi Wonsoon, a lawyer in Samdori, Jeju. Her father let her enter Shin-seong Girls' School, which a French priest had established.

Meanwhile, when Choi was eight years old, Korea came under Japanese rule. When she was 12, she received baptism because of the influence of her teacher nun. Then she became the first graduate in that school. After graduation, she entered Kyungsung National Women's High School to study education. Most of the teachers and students were Japanese, so Korean students faced much hostility.

== Career ==
After Emperor Gojong died in 1919, she went to Daehanmun and wept with compatriots. She organized a girl's suicide squad for save-the-nation drive with 79 students. It was led by Park, Heedo, who drafted the Declaration of Independence. They also joined the March First Movement and shouted "Hurrah for Korean Independence Day" after leaping over the fences of their dormitories. Consequently, she was caught by the Japanese military police and tortured.

After the hardships of prison life, she came back to her hometown. She was aware that teaching unenlightened people was necessary to get the country back. So she established Yeosuwon and taught students, illiterate people, women and girls. Because of the hardships of prison life, she was in poor health. Finally, she decided to learn medicine for philanthropic work. So she entered Kyungsung Women's Medical School when she was 37 years old. After getting a medical license, she worked in Seongmo Hospital.

Meanwhile, she heard the news that Jeju had a bad situation. So she came back to her hometown, opened Junghwa Hospital and treated patients. One year later, Korean Independence Day came, and she decided to make comrades be aware of their illiteracy. So she spread out movement of Shinseong's restoration and finally got a license of establishing Shinseong Girls' Middle School and High School. And she became the principal of those schools. She dedicated herself to women's education and welfare service in Jeju until she retired due to the age limit. After all, the Vatican conferred a decoration of the Pope for her merits of contribution to education, public welfare, and medicine.

After retirement as the principal, she was concentrating on treating patients. At that time, she heard the news that she had been elected to the first superintendent in Jeju. She has been the only woman superintendent in Korea. During the four years of her tenure in office, she built 270 elementary classrooms and 66 secondary classrooms. She focused on women's education and touched off a boom of library construction. In the end, she was honored with 516 national awards and she made a Junghwa scholarship fund with a prize of one million won. She devoted herself to the development of Jeju, but she could not accomplish her dream of becoming a nun. However, she lived like a nun as a spinster, and she gave her life to the work of God. She died at the age of 76 on 22 February 1977. After her death, she received a presidential citation in 1993, and she was selected as an independence movement fighter from Jeju in March 2006.
