= Seogwipo Recreational Forest =

Forest and park in Seogwipo, South Korea

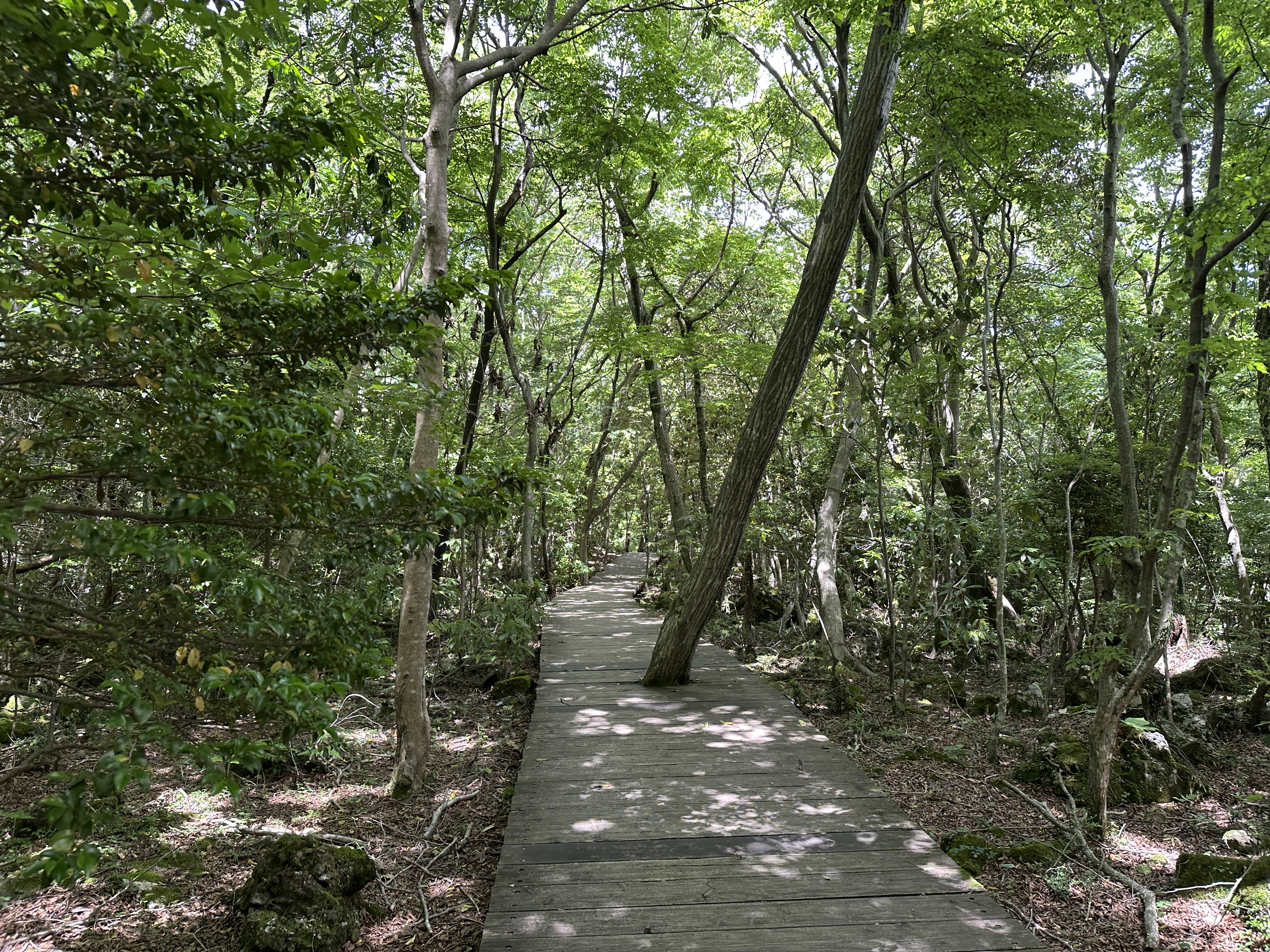
- Path in the forest (2026)
- Interactive map of Seogwipo Recreational Forest
- Location: Jungmun-dong, Seogwipo, South Korea
- Coordinates: 33.3128°N 126.4650°E
- Established: 1995

Korean name
- Hangul: 서귀포자연휴양림
- Hanja: 西歸浦自然休養林
- RR: Seogwipo jayeon hyuyangnim
- MR: Sŏgwip'o chayŏn hyuyangnim

Seogwipo Recreational Forest (Korean: 서귀포자연휴양림), also called Seogwipo Natural Recreation Forest, is a forest and park in Jungmun-dong, Seogwipo, Jeju Province, South Korea. The park was first established in 1995 and has an area of 2.55km^{2}.

The forest has a number of walking and cycling trails that have varied features. For example, one of the paths is meant to be walked on barefoot. It also has a camping grounds and parking space for 200 cars.

== Gallery ==
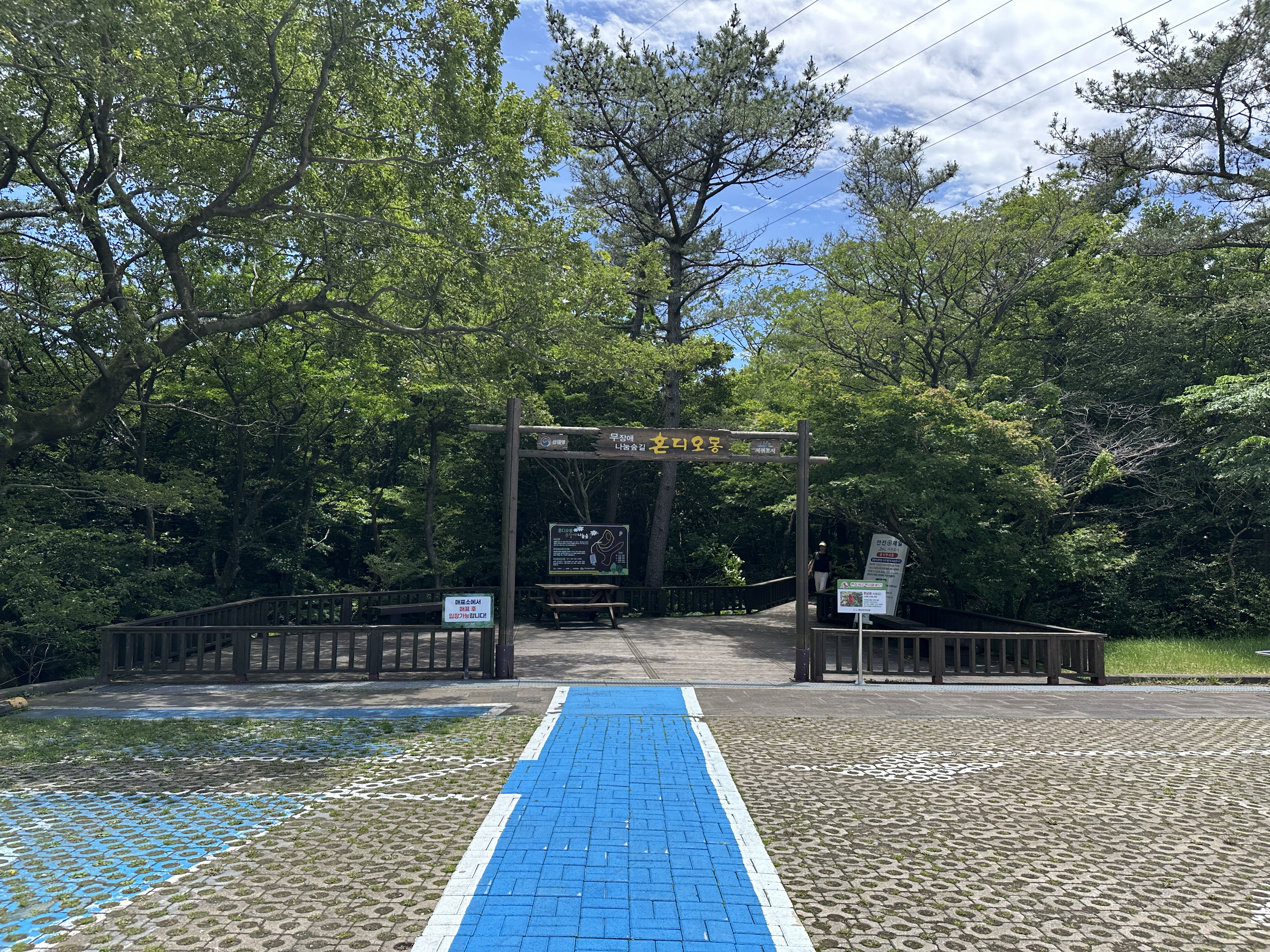
Entrance to one of the trails that has a wheelchair-accessible path (2026)

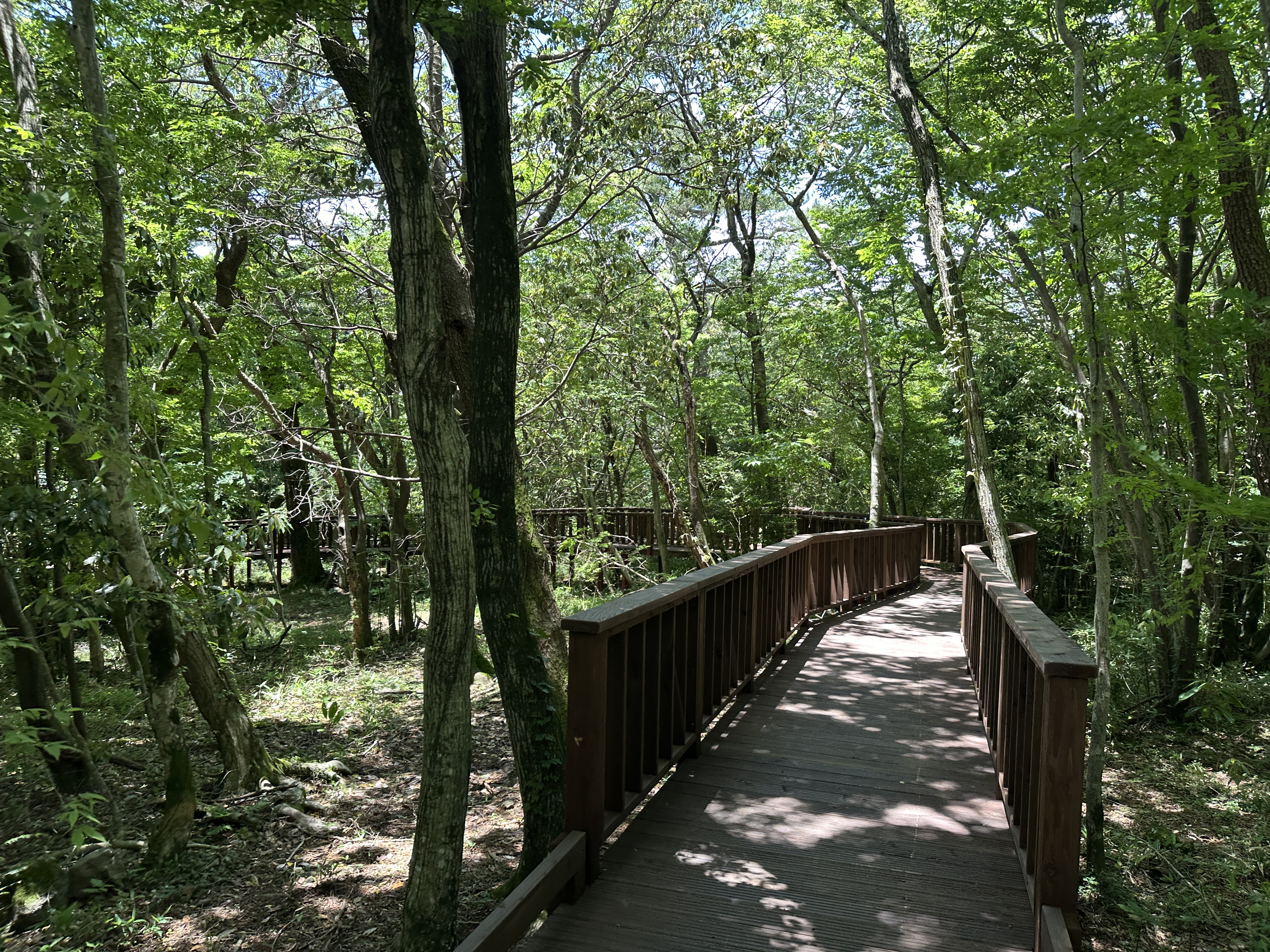
A wheelchair-accessible path (2026)

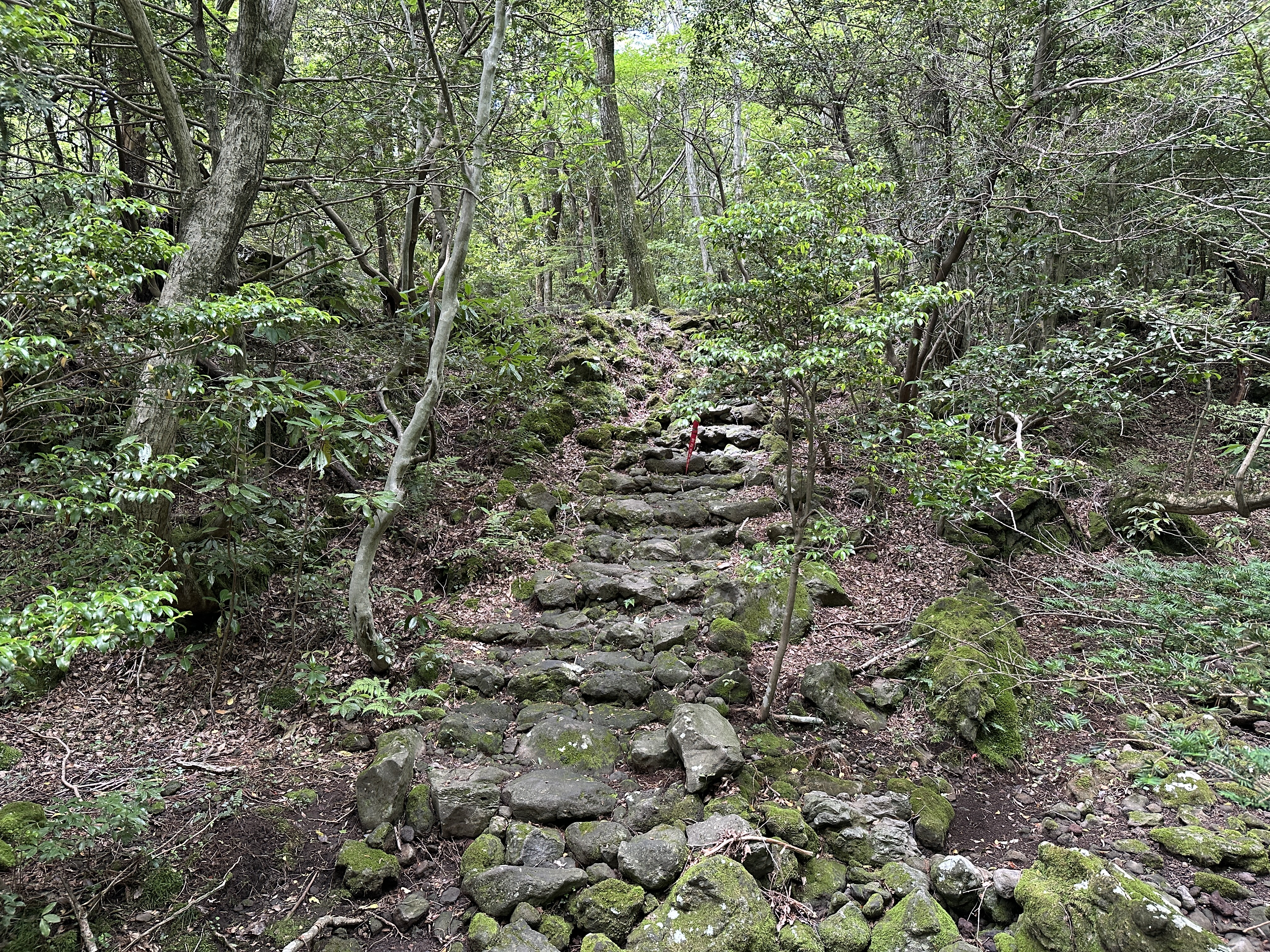
Stone path in one of the trails (2026)

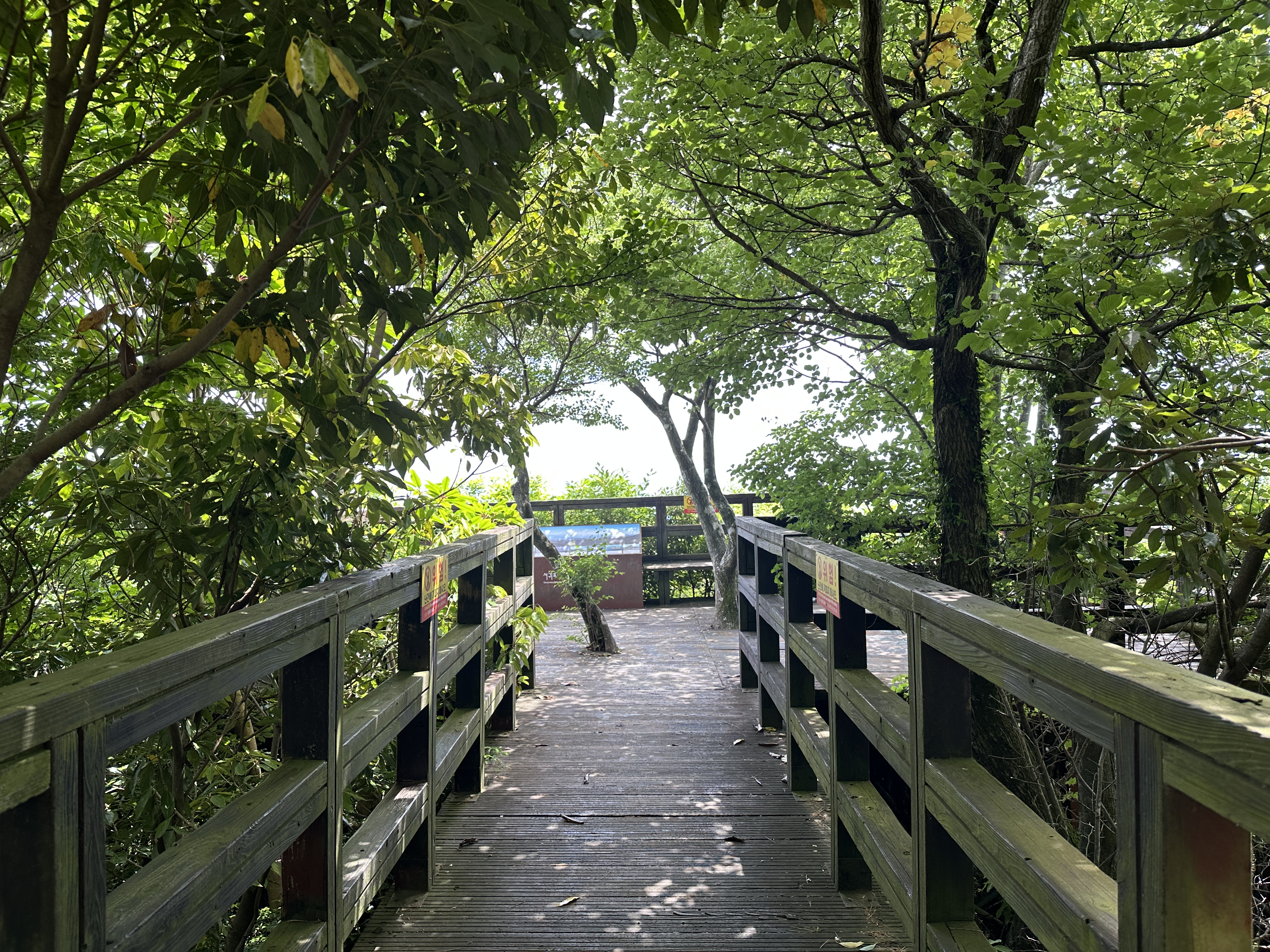
Point for viewing the local landscape (2026)

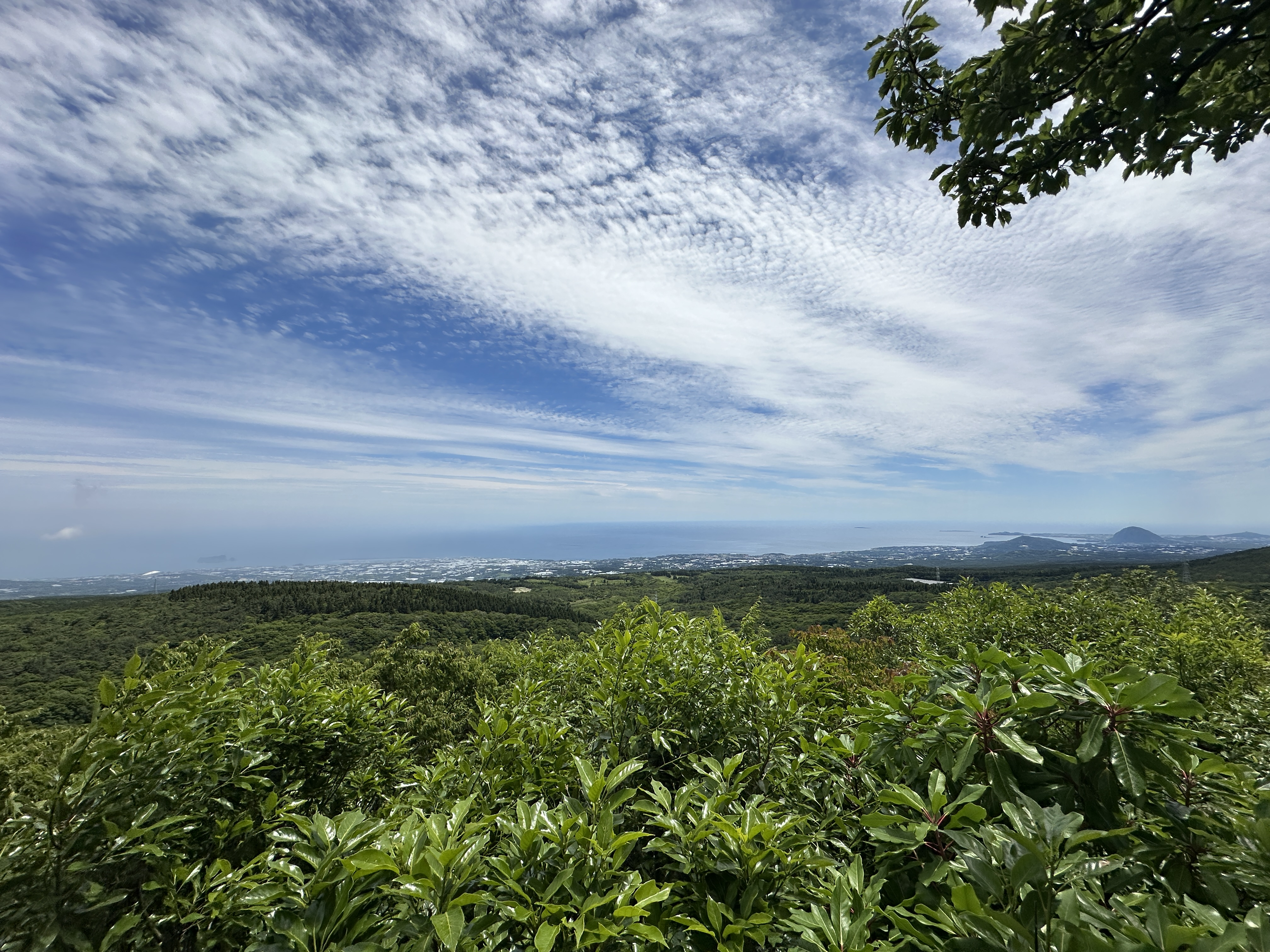
View from the forest, southwest (2026)

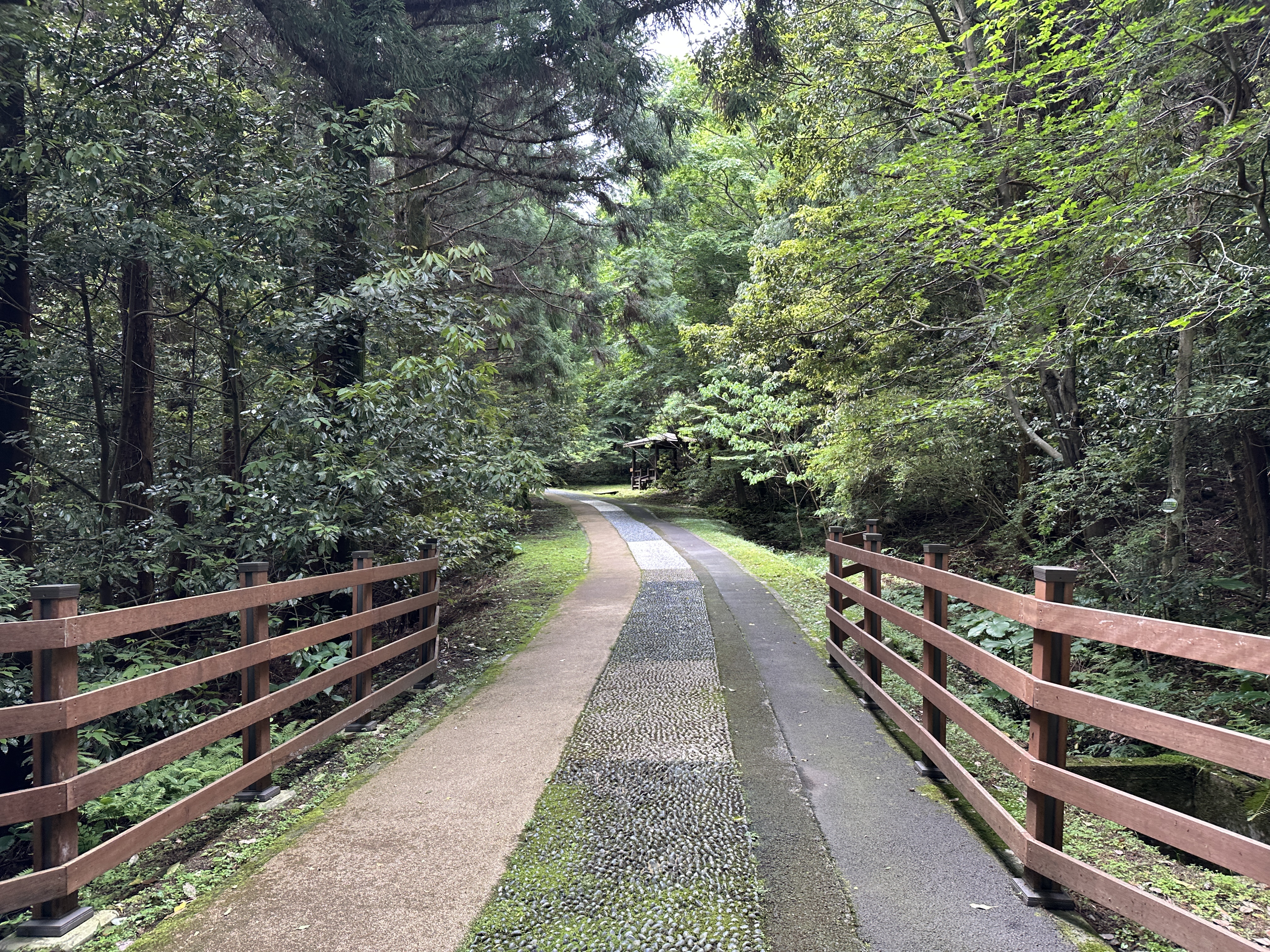
Walking paths with different textures for massaging feet (2026)

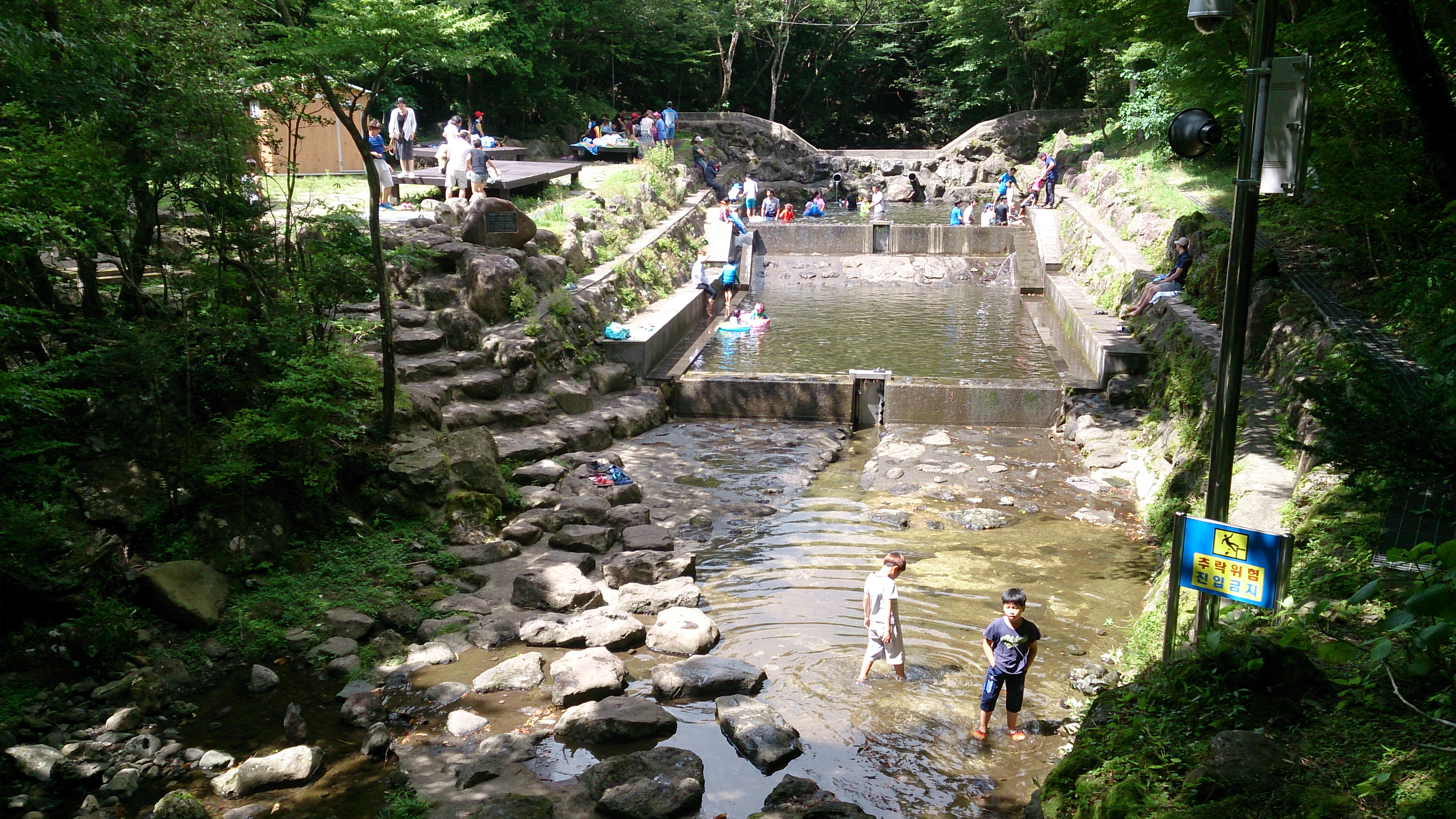
Outdoor swimming in the park (2014)
