= Yeomiji Botanical Garden =

Garden in Jeju, South Korea

Coordinates: 33°15′06″N 126°24′53″E

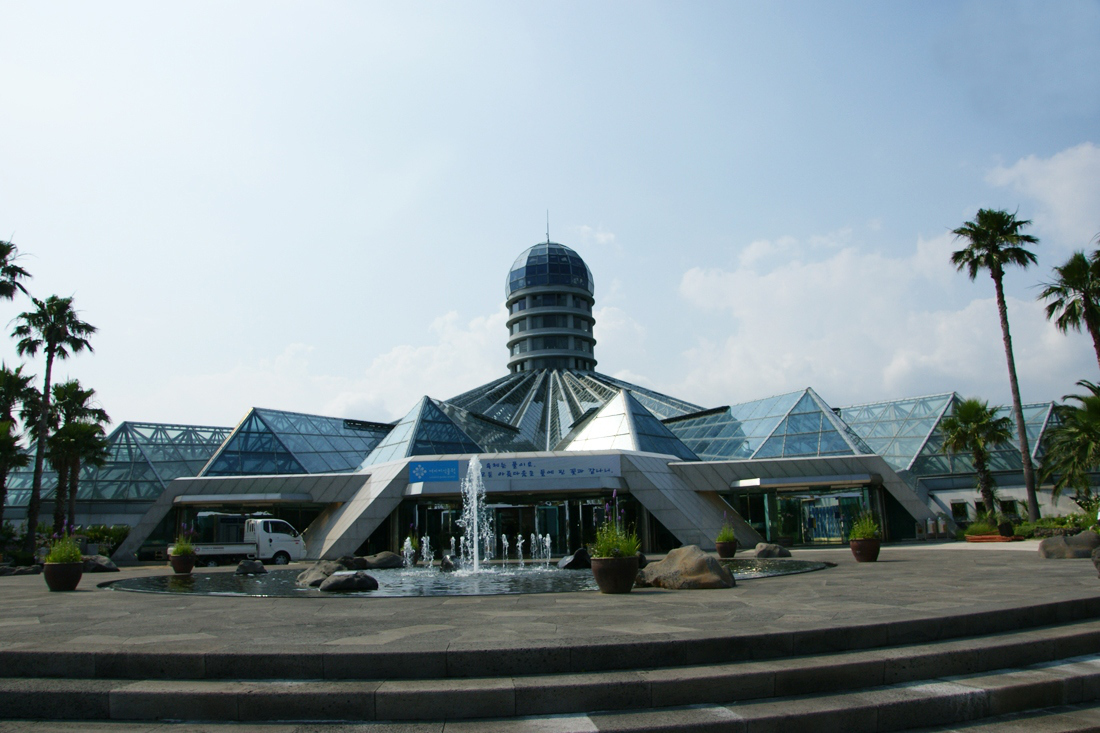
Yeomiji Botanical Garden

Yeomiji Botanical Garden (Korean: 여미지식물관) is botanical garden in Jungmun Tourism Complex, Seogwipo, Jeju-do, South Korea.

Inaugurated on October 12, 1989, Yeomiji used to be managed by Seoul Metropolitan Government. It was purchased by Buguk Development in 2005.

- Indoor gardens (over 1,300 species): under a massive sunflower-shaped structure, a 12,543-square-metre (135,010 sq ft) greenhouse featuring six thematic gardens (aquatic, flower, mystery, cactus, jungle, tropical), and a seasonal display.
- Outdoor gardens (over 1,000 species): four cultural gardens (Korean, Japanese, French, Italian), and theme gardens (endangered species and native plants, Jeju native plants, hosta garden, Rhododendron garden, herb garden, bog garden, lawn garden, cycas, perennial border).
