= Jungmun Saekdal Beach =

Beach on Jeju Island, South Korea

- Beach
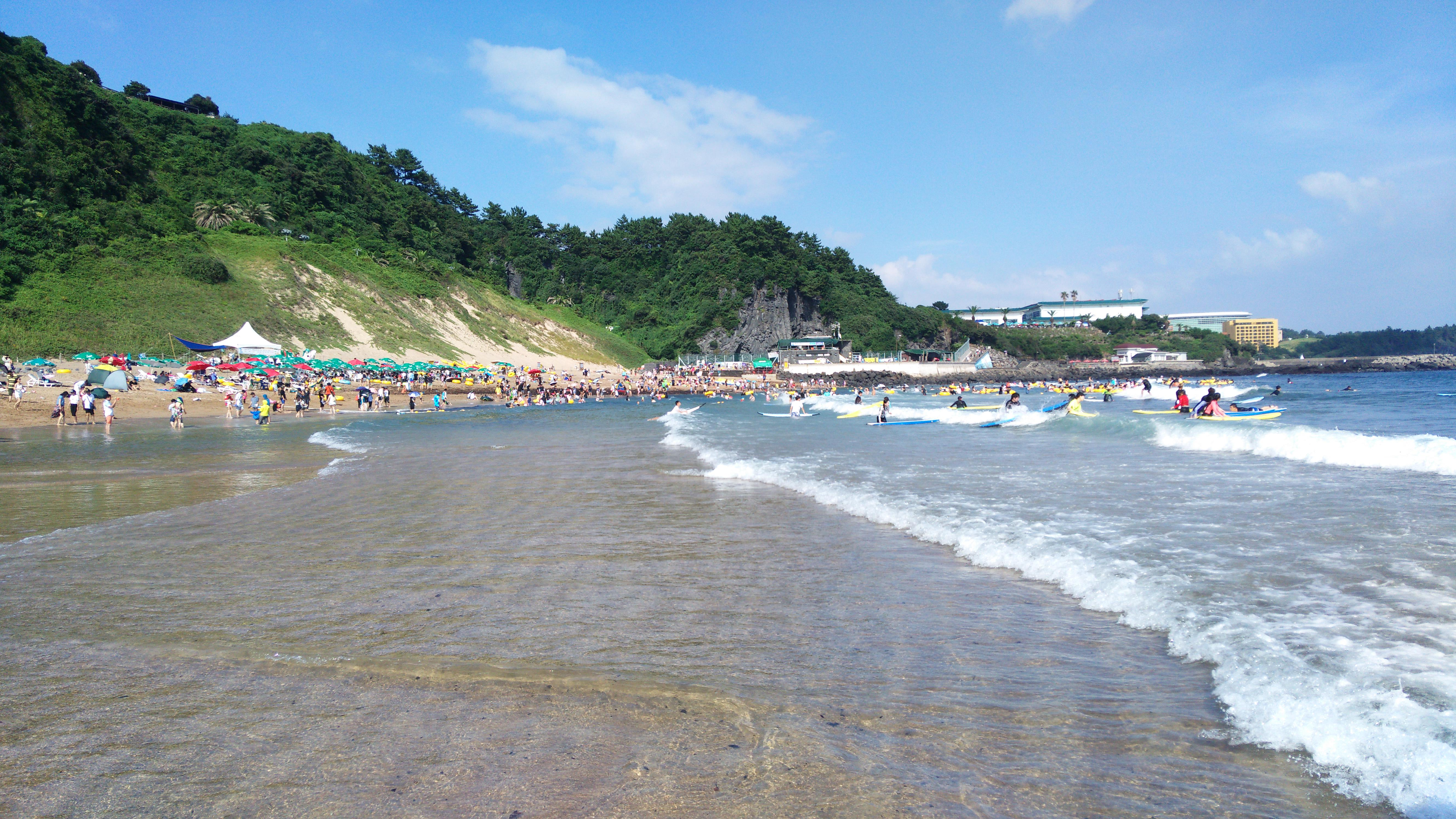
- The beach in 2016
- Interactive map of Jungmun Saekdal Beach
- Coordinates: 33.245°N 126.411°E
- Location: Saekdal-dong, Seogwipo, Jeju Province, South Korea

Korean name
- Hangul: 중문색달해수욕장
- Hanja: 中文穡達海水浴場
- RR: Jungmun saekdal haesuyokjang
- MR: Chungmun saektal haesuyokchang

Jungmun Saekdal Beach (Korean: 중문색달해수욕장) is a beach in Saekdal-dong, Seogwipo, Jeju Province, South Korea. The beach is 560 metres (1,840 ft) long and 50 metres (160 ft) wide, and the sand features a variety of colors, including black, white, red, and gray.

In 1999, following an environmental water quality investigation conducted by the Korean Federation for Environmental Movement, Jungmun Saekdal Beach was chosen as the best uncontaminated beach among 44 beaches in South Korea. The beach has held events like the Winter Sea Penguin Swimming Competition, Summer Shore Movie Expo, and the International Surfing Competition.

== Natural environment ==
There is a 15-metre-high (49 ft) sea cave on the right side of the sandbar and behind the cave, rocks are surrounded like the byeongpung (병풍, Korean traditional folding screen). During the ebb tide, the beach generates the hanging water on the right entrance of the bay. The current is rather rough, and many surfers come to the beach. In the past, bidan moshi clams (비단모시조개, a clam found in Jeju) were often caught. During June and July, wangbadageobuk (왕바다거북, a large sea turtle), an endangered species, occasionally comes up the shore and lay eggs.

With the Seogwipo Chilsiplihaean (서귀포 칠십리해안) beach as the center, Jungmun Tourist Complex sits on the left and has views of the beach.

== Surfing ==
Jungmun Beach is the home of the first surfing club in Korea, established in 1995. In this surfing spot is hosted an Annual Jeju Surfing Competition since 2005, and Korean people visit the beach to learn to surf. In summer, swells from the south are common.

== Facilities ==
The Jungmun Saekdal Beach has a number of facilities for the visitors. Inside the area, there is an oceanarium, the Yeomigi Botanical Garden (여미지 식물원), Sun-im Bridge (선임교), and Cheonjeyeon Falls (천재연 폭포). In addition, many events are held all year round. A parking facility is also present with spaces for 150 cars.

== See also ==
- List of beaches in Jeju Province
