= Saeseom =

Island in Seogwipo, South Korea

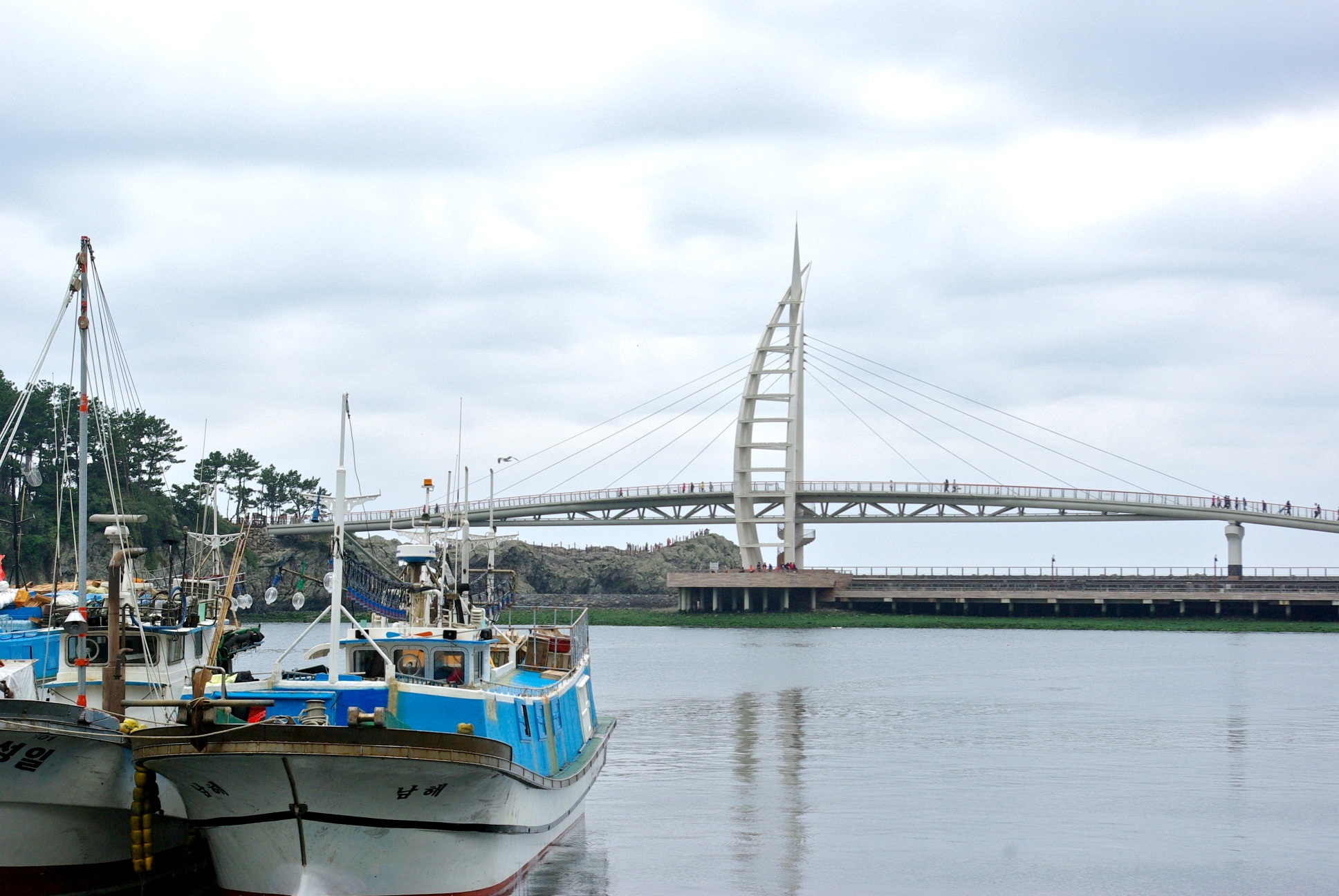
- Saeyeon Bridge, which connects the island to the mainland. The island is to the left (2010)
- Interactive map of Saeseom

Geography
- Location: Seogwipo-dong, Seogwipo, Jeju Province, South Korea
- Coordinates: 33.2364°N 126.5622°E
- Area covered: 104,137 m^{2} (1,120,920 sq ft)

Saeseom (Korean: 새섬) is an island in Seogwipo Port in Seogwipo-dong, Seogwipo, Jeju Province, South Korea. It has an area of 104,137 m^{2} (1,120,920 ft^{2}) and is relatively short, with its highest point at 19 m (62 ft) above sea level. It is connected to the mainland via Saeyeon Bridge. Much of the island is a park called Saeseom Park (새섬공원).

== Description ==
"Saeseom" means "island of silver grass". It is a native Korean name and not a Sino-Korean word; thus it does not have a set Hanja associated with it. When written in Hanja, the name was rendered as either Chodo (초도; 草島; lit. 'grass island') or Modo (모도; 茅島; lit. 'island of silver grass'). During the 1910–1945 Japanese colonial period, the Japanese mistakenly thought the "sae" in the island's name referred to birds (새), and wrote the island's name as Jodo (조도; 鳥島; lit. 'bird island'). A writer for the Encyclopedia of Korean Local Culture evaluated the Modo Hanja rendering as the most suitable.

The island was uninhabited until around 1965. Much of the island was made into a public park upon the completion of Saeyeon Bridge on September 30, 2009. It is currently partly privately and publicly owned. The island functions somewhat as a breakwater, and makes the water of the harbor calmer.

The island is now a popular place for walking and leisure, and has 1.2 km (0.75 mi) of hiking trails. Much of the island is covered by forest. The island's hiking trails have been continually updated over time. In 2022, a wooden deck was installed at the entrance of the island, and wooden guard rails were installed at elevated areas. Access to the island is restricted during severe weather, like typhoons. During bad weather, the bridge has gates that close to block entry to the island. The bridge itself is a tourist attraction, as it has fountains and a light show on the side. The fountain has a water and light show from April to May and June to October at various intervals in the evenings.

There are a large number of varied species of trees on the island, although most are varieties of pine. Tall grasses also grow, including the eponymous silver grass. Migratory birds land on the island.
