= Citrus Museum =

Museum in Jeju, South Korea

Coordinates: 33°15′27.1″N 126°34′41″E

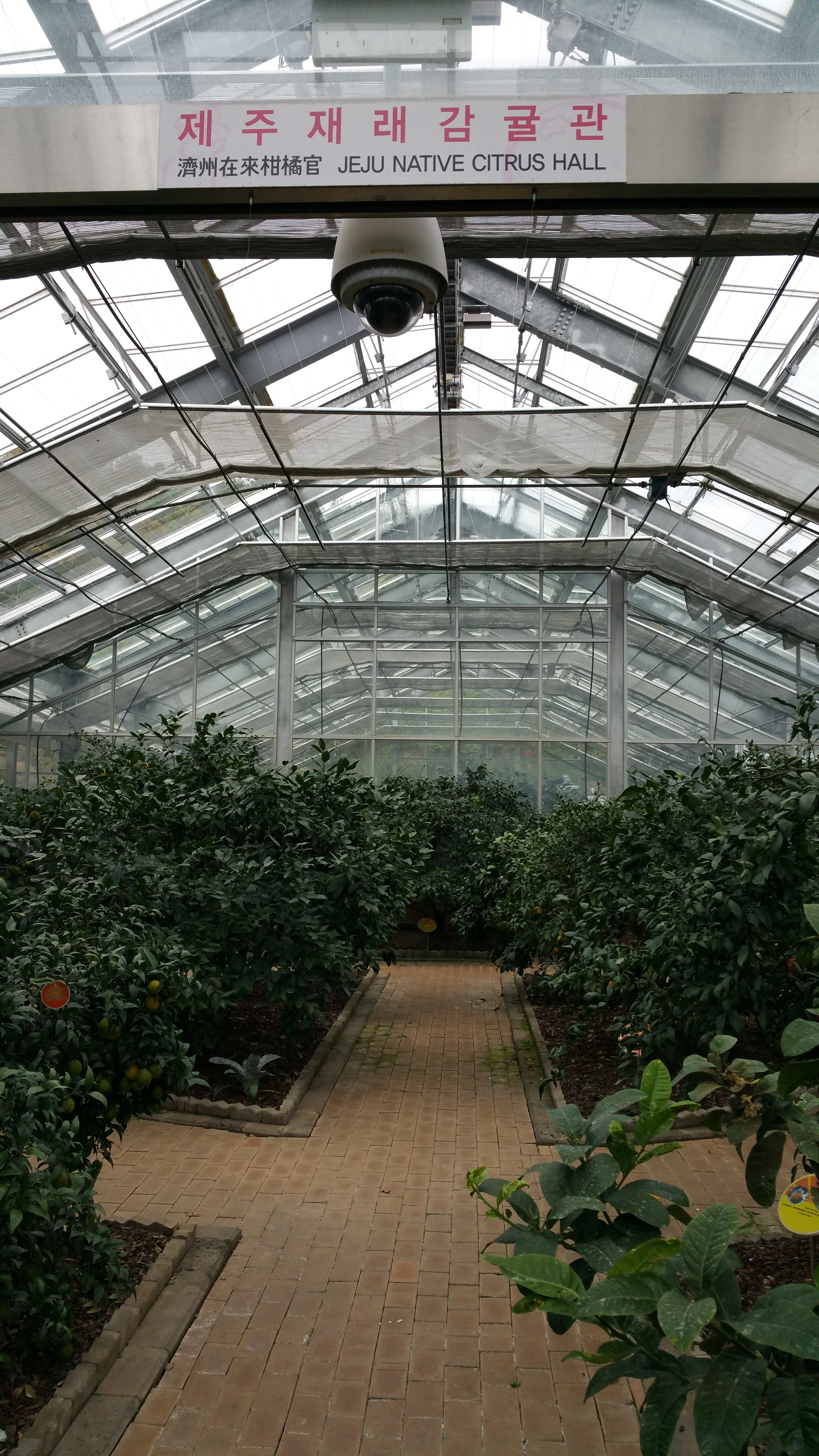
- Established: February 25, 2005
- Location: 441 Hyodonsunhwan-ro, Seogwipo, Jejudo
- Website: Official website

Korean name
- Hangul: 감귤박물관
- Hanja: 柑橘博物館
- RR: Gamgyul bangmulgwan
- MR: Kamgyul pangmulgwan

The Citrus Museum (Korean: 감귤박물관), also known as Seogwipo Citrus Museum, is a public museum in Seogwipo, Jeju Province, South Korea. It is dedicated to citruses, which Jeju is known for producing. It is managed and operated by Seogwipo city government. The museum displays items related to the history and culture of citrus and the citrus industry.

== History and location ==
The museum opened on February 25, 2005, in the Sinhyo-dong district of Seogwipo City, at the foot of Wollabong Peak. Located on a sprawling hillside, the facilities include the museum, an artificial waterfall, a citrus experiential learning field, a farming recreation complex and an agricultural product distribution center. The specific goal was described by the museum's manager, Hyun-gwan Cheol in 2011, "We need to tell people about the value of citrus. We need to save [its] history".

The museum is an affiliate of the citrus industry in Jeju Island along with the Citrus Research Station, the Climate Change Research Center and South Korea's National Gardening & Herbal Medicine Research Institute. It is recognized by citrus researchers as a source of information for the history and development of the citrus industry in South Korea, as well as citrus-related technologies, products and entertainments.

In 2015, The Korea Times reported that Jeju produces most of the citrus fruit consumed domestically in Korea with a total of 3,600 tons of fruit exported in 2014; 1,500 tons going to Britain, and 722 tons going to Canada. Some of the local fruits are the gamgyul, which is grown in open fields; hallabong, created especially for Jeju, and cheonhaehyang, both grown in greenhouses; and unshu, grown in fields and greenhouses.

Generations of rural families supported themselves and their children's education with the industry, especially from the 1970s to the 1990s. Dropping prices in 2002 caused the farmers to diversify, some branching into the tourism industry with "experience programs", where visitors picked their own fruit. The government provided the farmers subsidies to help stabilize prices, with gamgyul picking retaining its important role in the island's culture and economy.

Jeju has been designated a World Heritage Site by UNESCO, and the Korea Tourism Organization named the museum as one of eighteen named "special tourist zones" of Jeju Island.

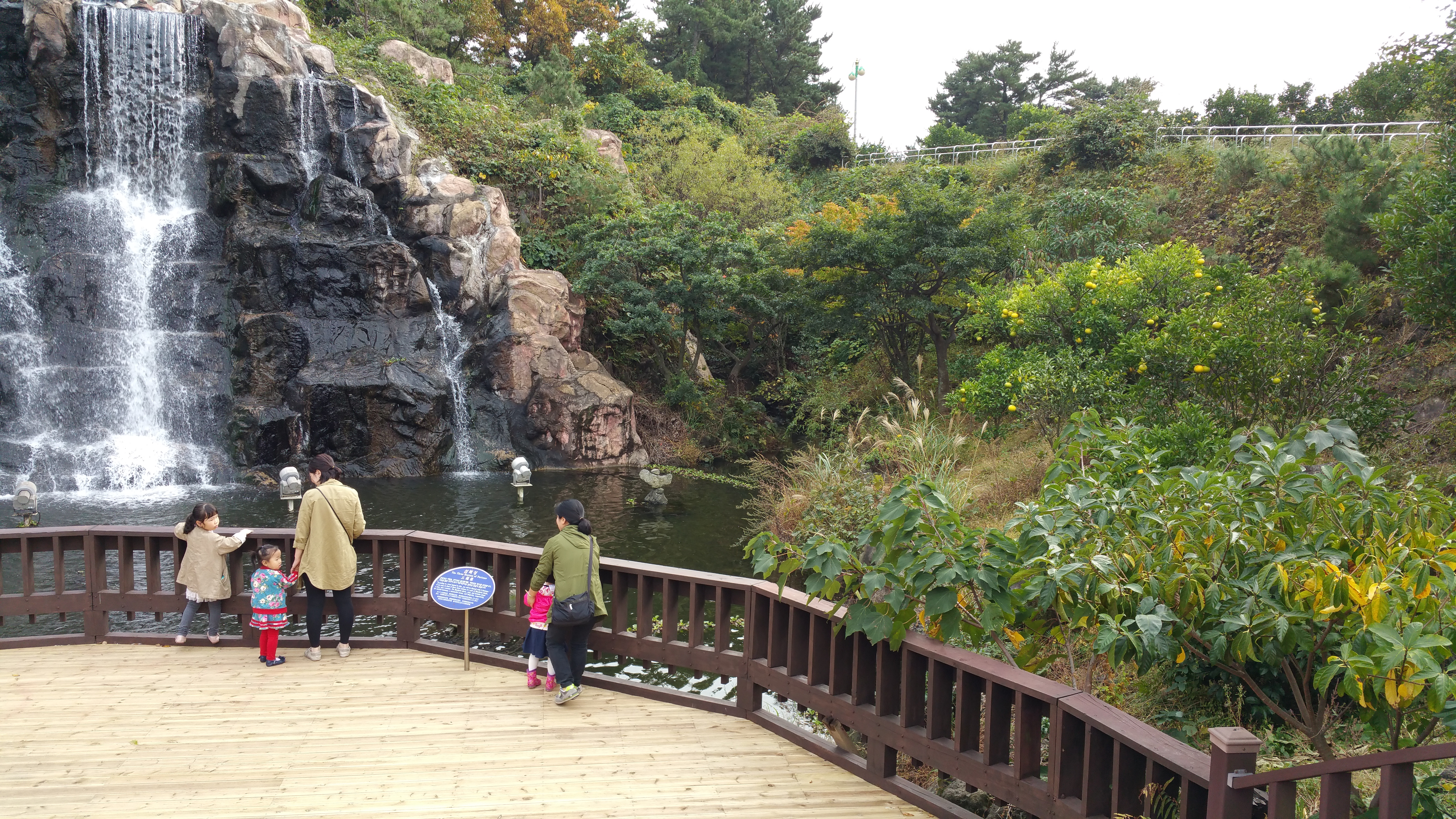
Artificial waterfall by orchard.

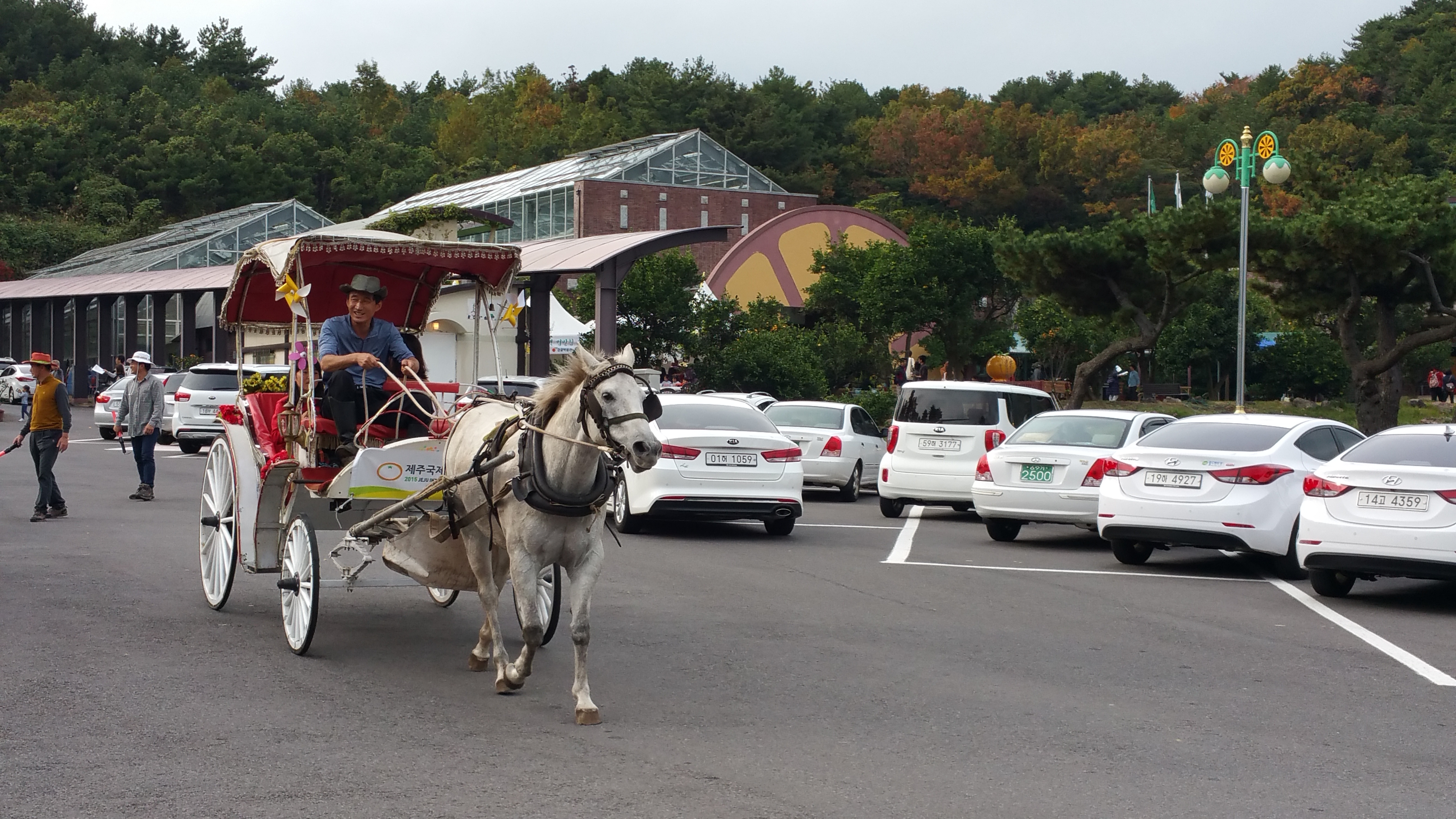
Citrus museum buggy ride.

== Facilities ==
The facilities consist of areas both inside and outside the museum: a themed exhibition hall, 3D image room and seminar room, folk relic exhibition hall, special exhibition hall, world citrus orchard, and a subtropical botanical garden

Inside the museum there is an interactive learning exhibition, an arcade of 3D videos, interactive maps, sniffing stations, insect galleries, citrus products from all over the world and an observatory. The first exhibition room provides a history of types of citrus fruits, cultivation methods, and country of origin. The second exhibition room explains the trend of the citrus industry and the processing industry such as citrus juice. The exhibition room of folk relics shows Jeju's ancestral farming and household goods. Sarah Warren, a journalist for The Jeju Weekly, noted one item of interest in the exhibit, the dottongsi, a traditional Jeju toilet. And, the Citrus Virtual Experience Room gives a view of real citrus farming. The exhibits show a glimpse of Jeju residents' lives.

The world citrus exhibition is located in the greenhouses at the back of the museum and staff call it a "secret garden" and a favorite of visitors, with over 100 kinds of citrus fruit, including the largest and smallest, and unusual ones like the Buddha's hand. It is divided into sections, including the Asian Pavilion, the Japanese Pavilion, the American Pavilion, the European Pavilion, and the Korean Pavilion; some of the subtropical plants are mango, papaya and guava.

Outside is the picking orchard, artificial waterfalls, walking trail, playground and small workout facility.

== International citrus exposition ==
Since 2013, it has participated as joint host for the annual Seogwipo World Citrus Pre-Expo (and later Expos), always held in November, with local government and industry affiliates. Some of these include: Agriculture, Livestock and Livestock Foods Department, Rural Development Administration, National Agricultural Products Quality Management Institute, Jeju Special Self-Governing Province Development Corporation, Jeju Special Self-Governing Province Tourism Association, Jeju Tourism Organization, KOTRA, Jeju Chamber of Commerce, Ministry of Agriculture, and NACF.

The 2013 pre-exo was themed "The Future of Seogwipo and its Globally Renowned Citrus", and provided visitors a chance to compare Jeju's local citrus with citrus from eight other countries, including the United States, France, China and Japan. In 2015, the first expo, Jeju International Citrus Expo 2015, with some 174,000 visitors, discussed "The Future of Jeju, the Worldwide Prestigious Citrus" with the goal of raising the competitiveness of the Korean orange industry globally and providing more export opportunities for local varieties like the gamgyul.

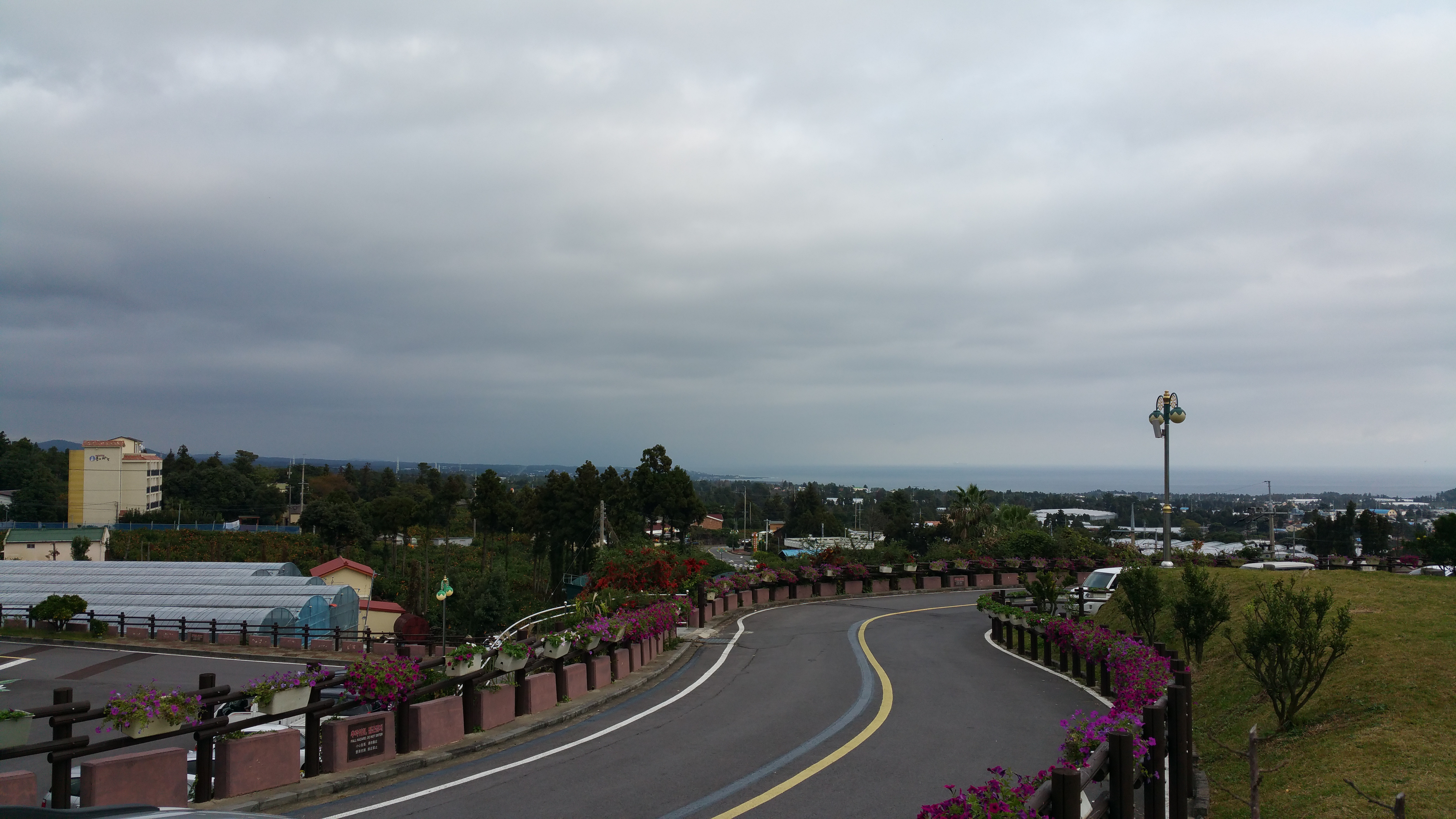
View from grounds towards ocean.

== Events and programs ==
The museum and facilities offer monthly hands-on programs, such as making cookies, cakes, mandarin candles and soaps. One example was the July 25th, 2015 "Citrus and Jelly Making" program with 17 teams and 73 participants, followed by "Tangerine Muffin Making" in August. Depending on the season, visitors can pick citrus fruit and sample either the citrus or the edible citrus blossoms. Some more organized events are tree propagation, tie-dyeing with tangerine peels and the art of citrus tea making. In addition to cooking and making citrus items, the well-being experience program includes a footbath experience site.

In December 2014, Seogwipo city promoted the museum with other nearby sightseeing places including Cheonjiyeon Falls, Jeongbang Falls, Mt. Sanbangsan and the Yongmeori Coast after a decrease in visitors following the Sinking of MV Sewol's effect on school excursions traveling from the mainland to Jeju.

The museum holds special art exhibits, in addition to its main collections. In December 2012 through January 2013, the work of Koh Jae Man, "famous mandarins" as symbols of the island, was shown. And artist Do-Hee Jeon "2015 Botanical Art Exhibition" was shown at the museum In 2016, they held a citrus floral fragrance children's literary contest winner exhibition.
