= Sammaebong =

Hill in Seogwipo, Jeju Province, South Korea

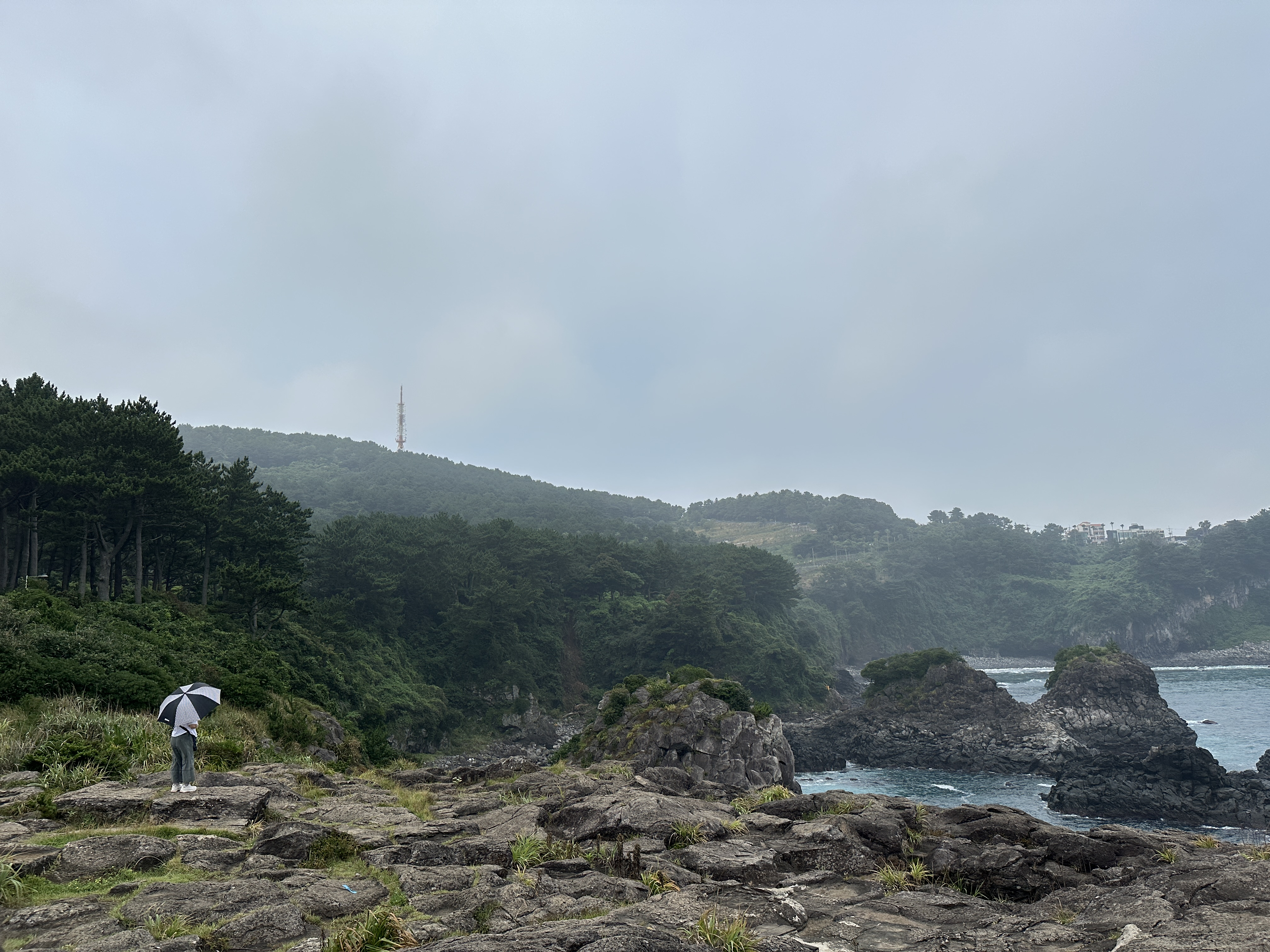
- Sammaebong (in the distance, with tower)

Highest point
- Coordinates: 33.2440°N 126.5469°E

Geography

Korean name
- Hangul: 삼매봉
- Hanja: 三梅峰
- RR: Sammaebong
- MR: Sammaebong

Sammaebong (Korean: 삼매봉), also called Sammaebong Peak, is an oreum (small extinct volcano) and public park in Seohong-dong, Seogwipo, Jeju Province, South Korea.

The hill has a height of 104m. There are several hiking trails on it. On the hill's summit is various amenities, including exercise equipment and a pagoda.

== Gallery ==
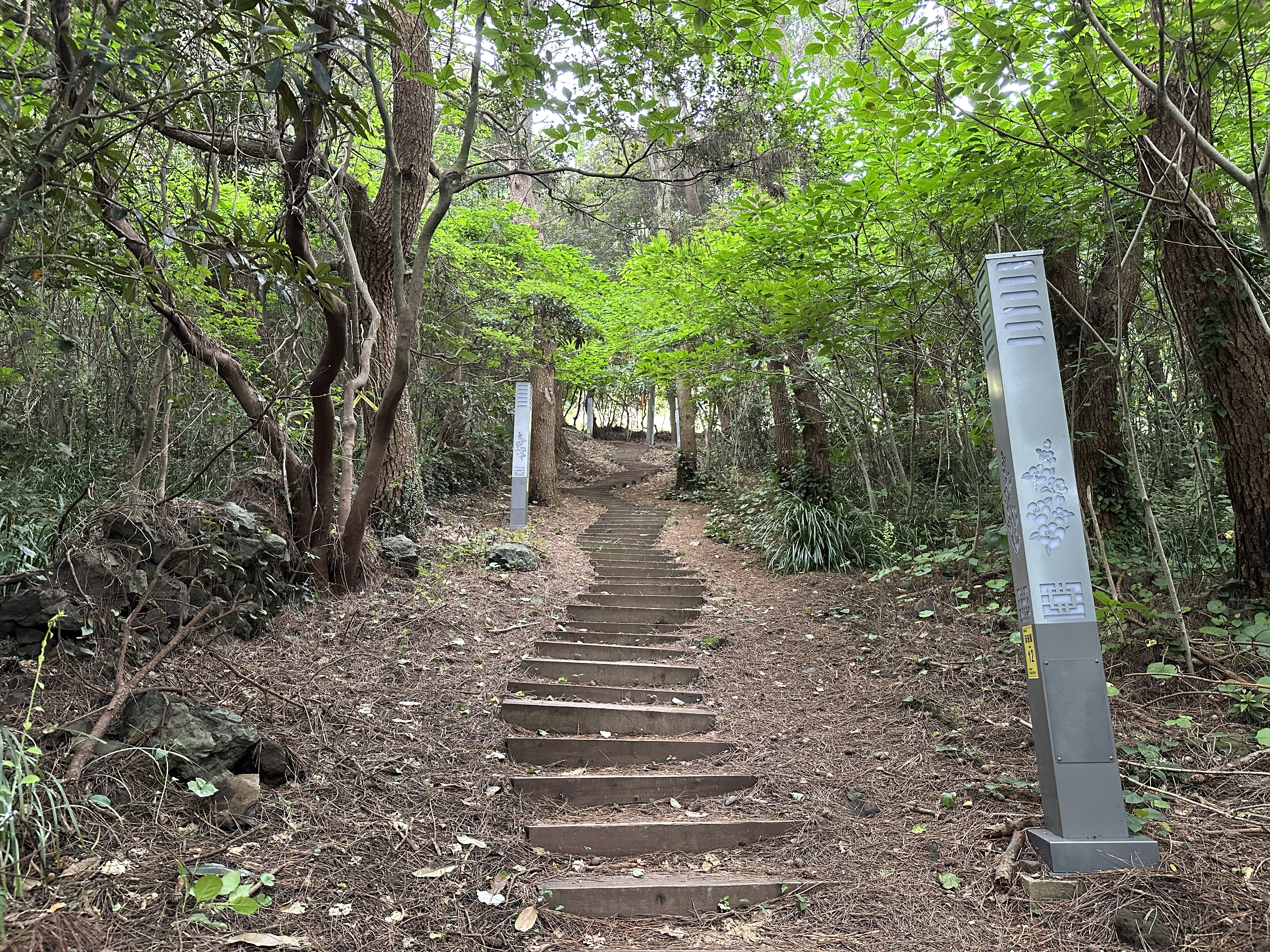
Trail on the peak (2026)

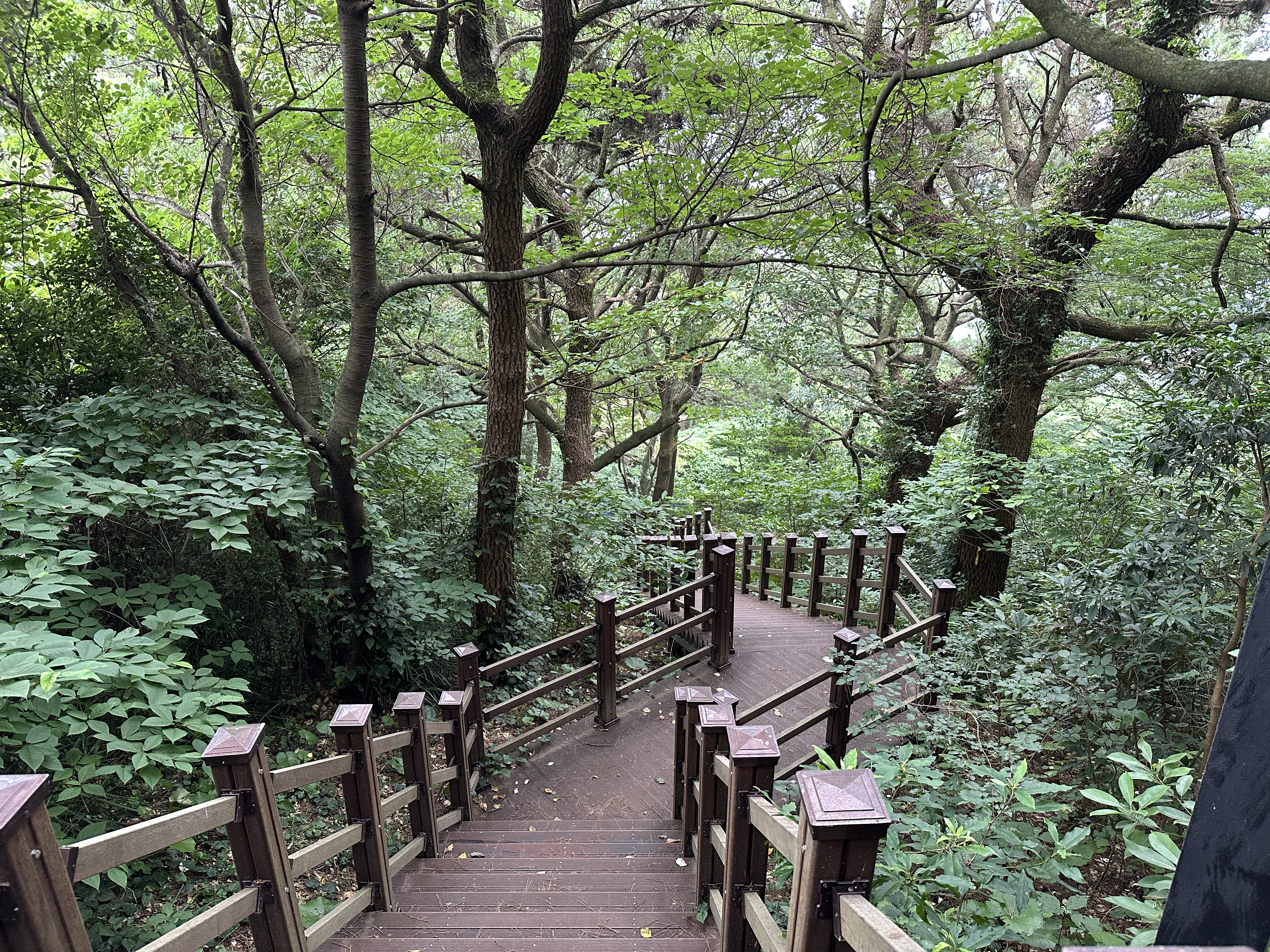
Trail (2026)

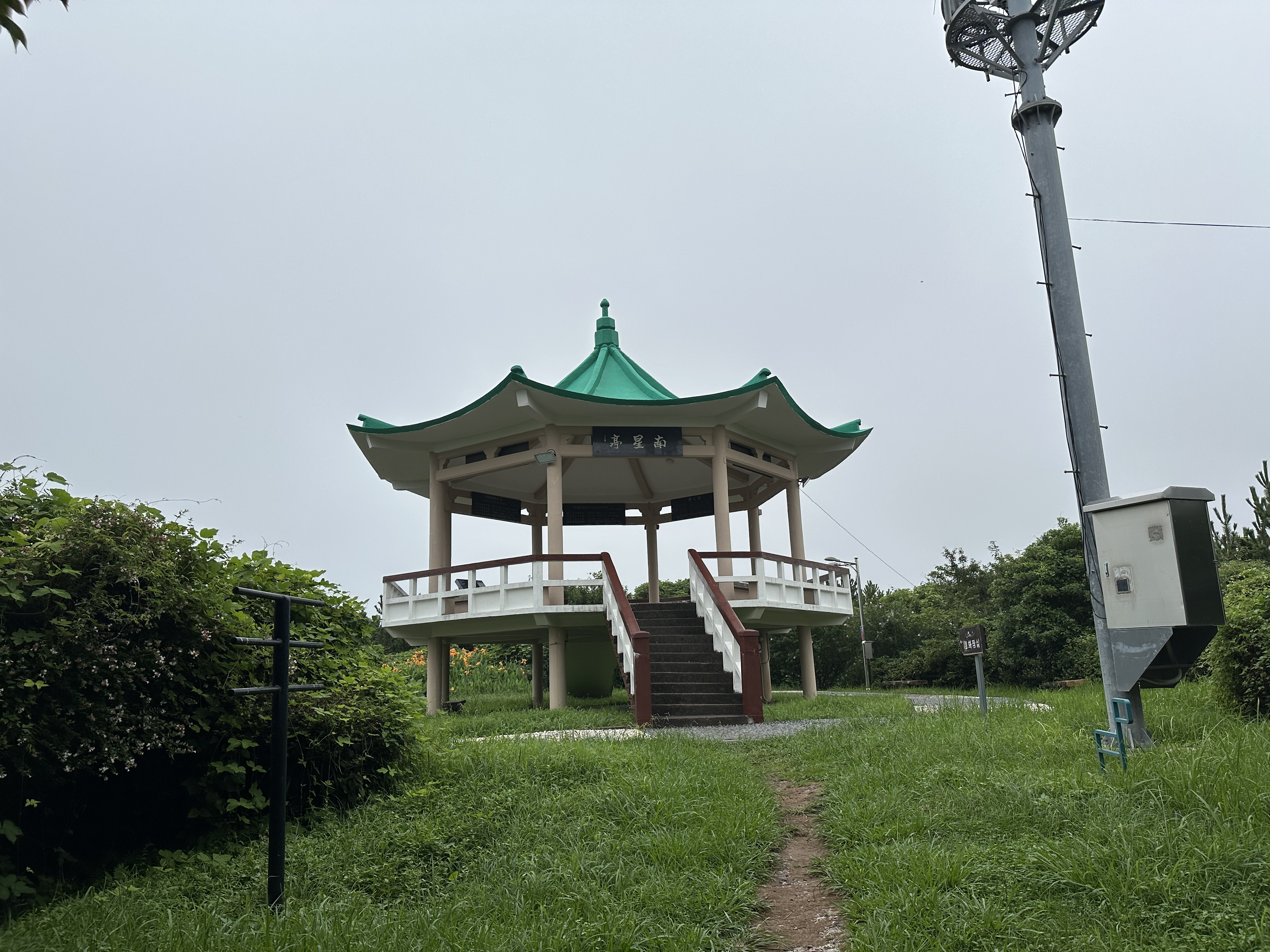
Pagoda at the peak (2026)

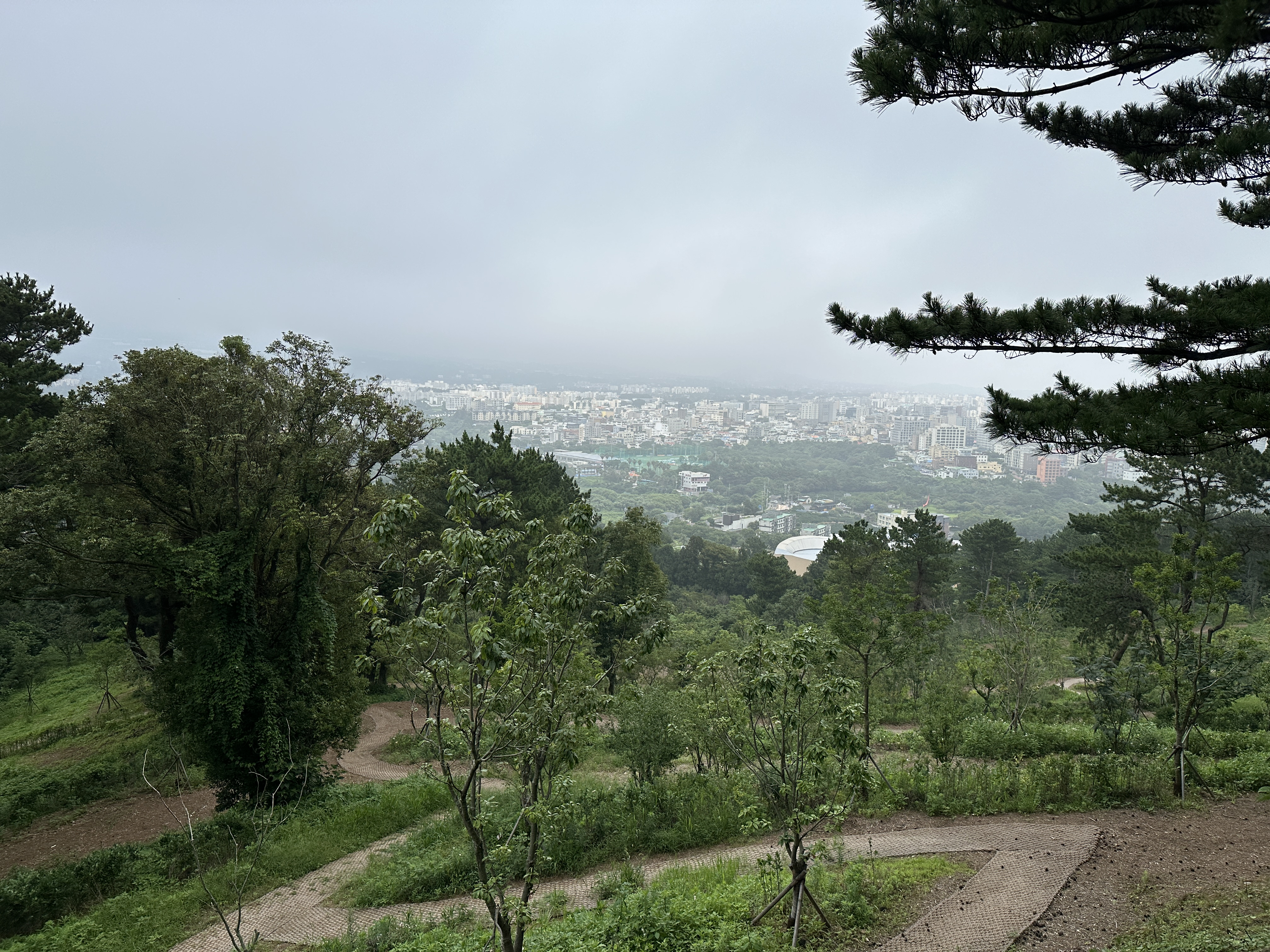
Trails and view to the north (2026)
