= Seogwipo =

City in Jeju, South Korea

Coordinates: 33°14′59″N 126°33′36″E

- Administrative city
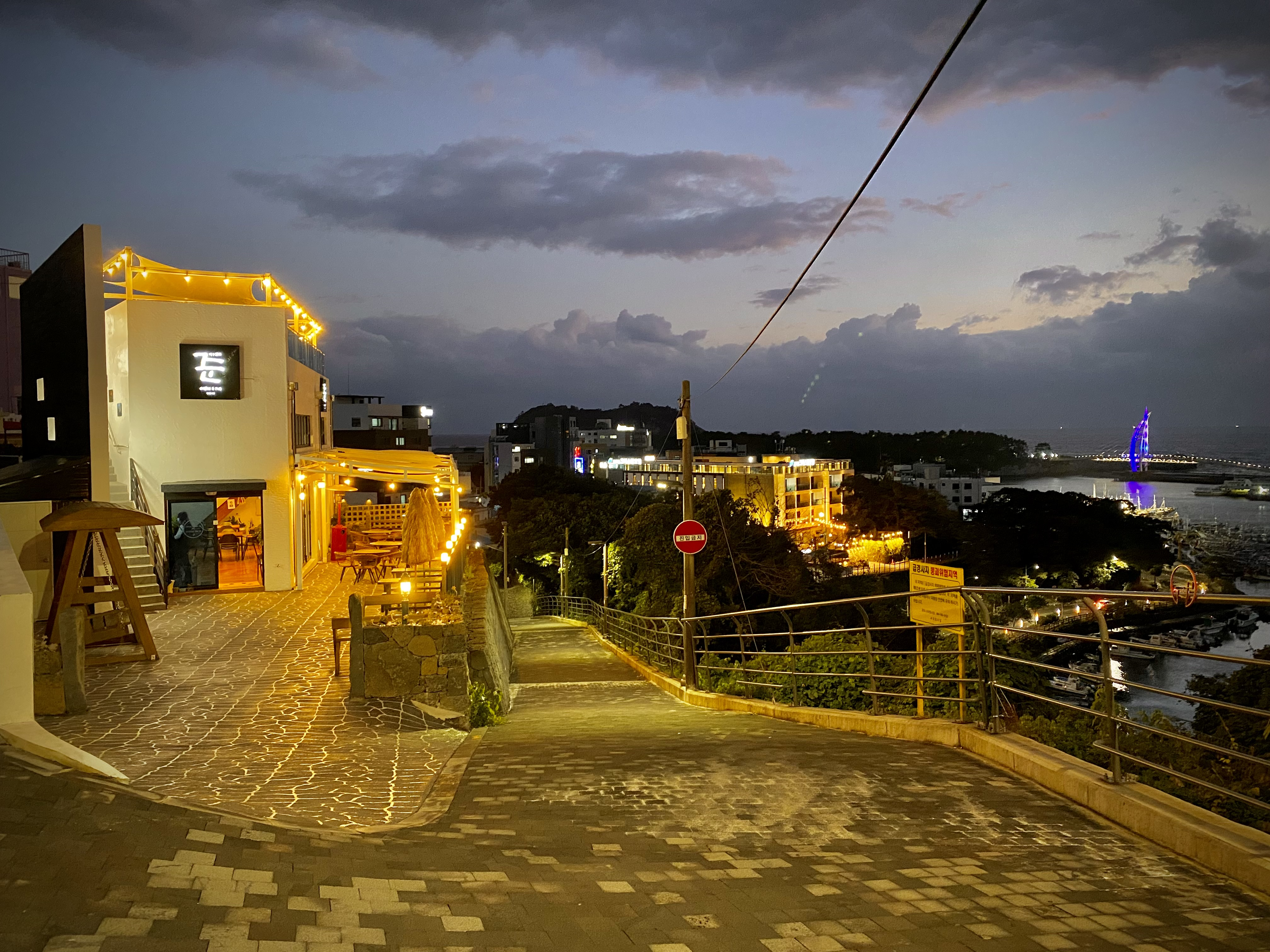
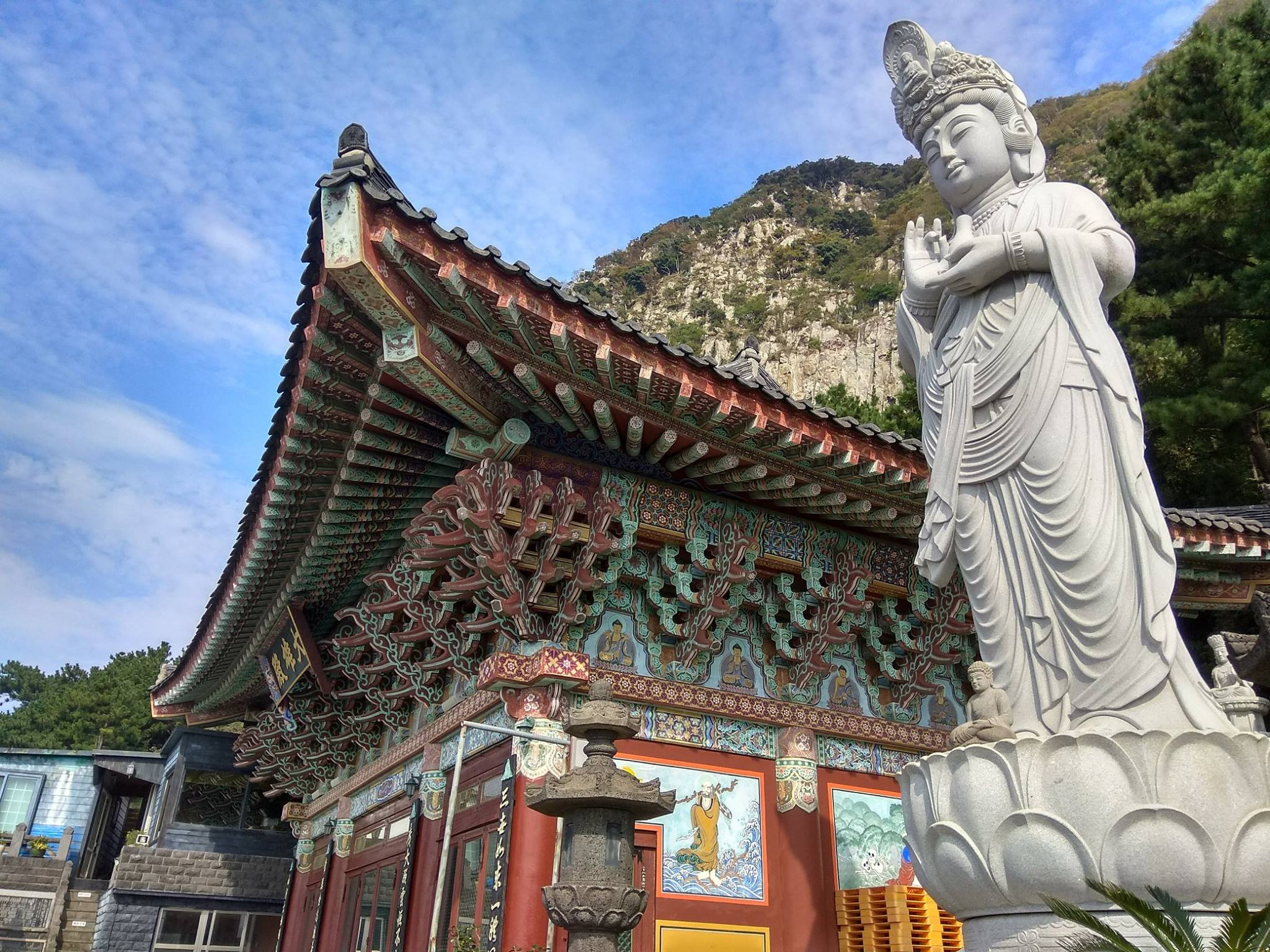
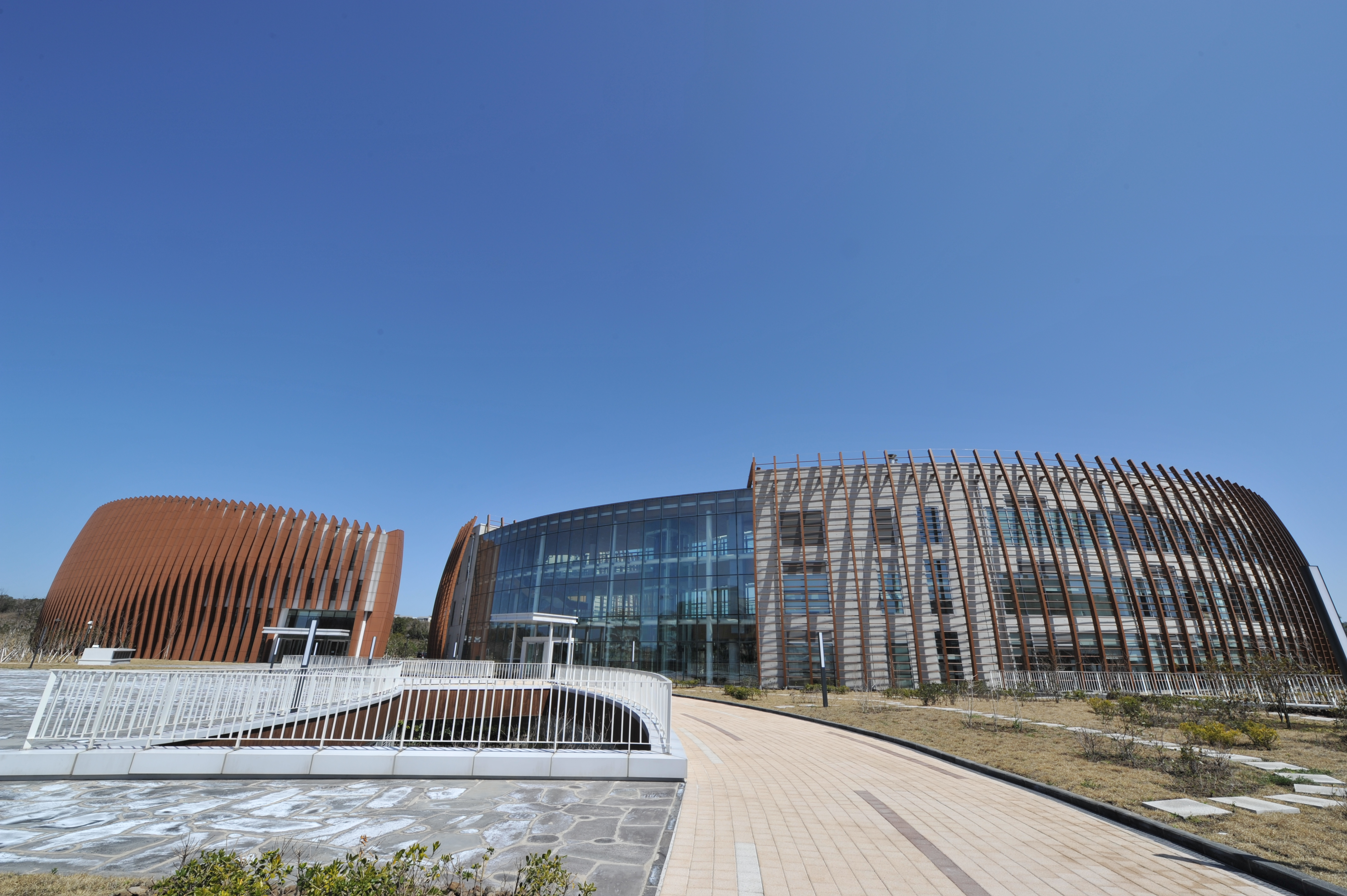
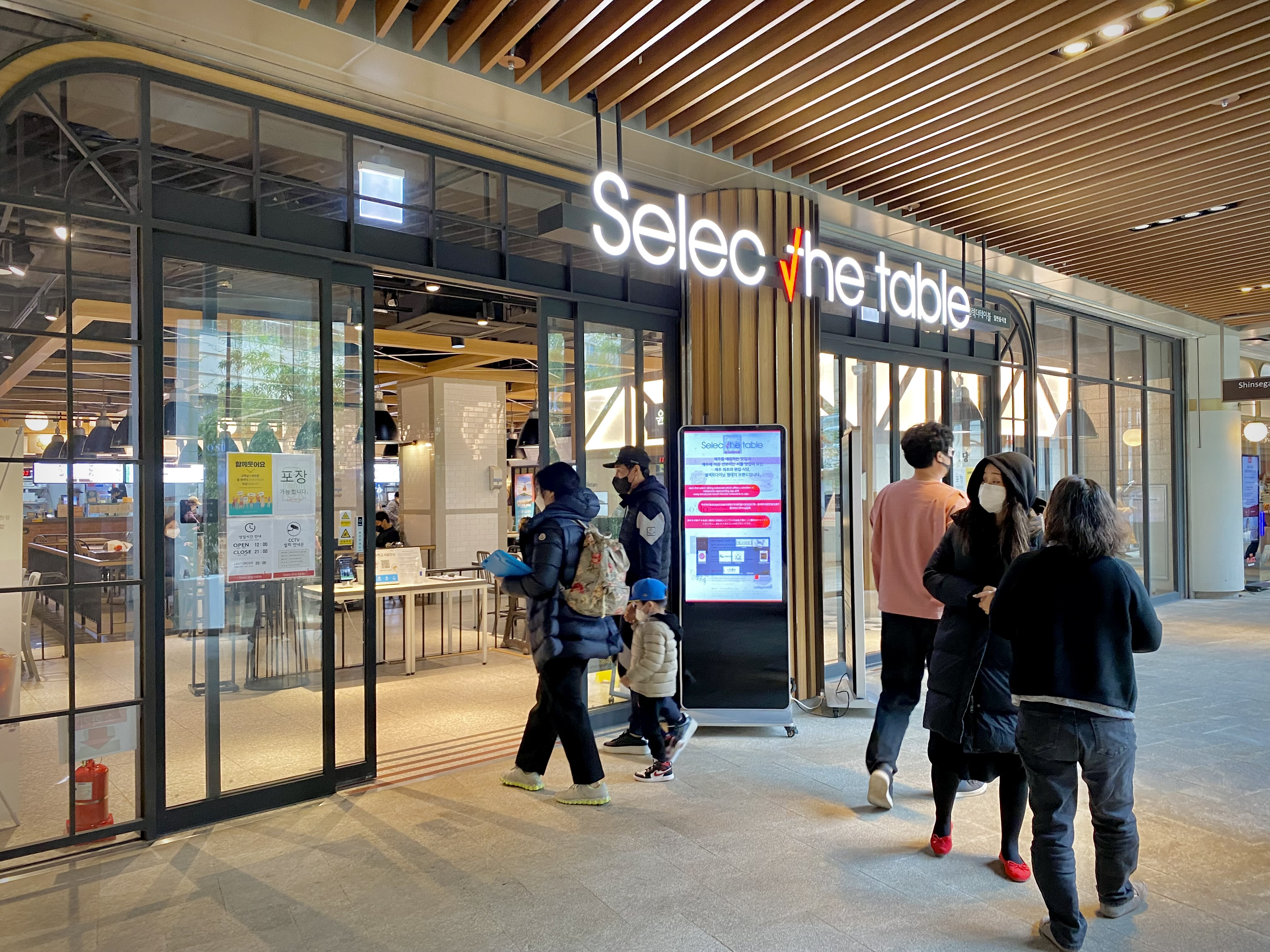
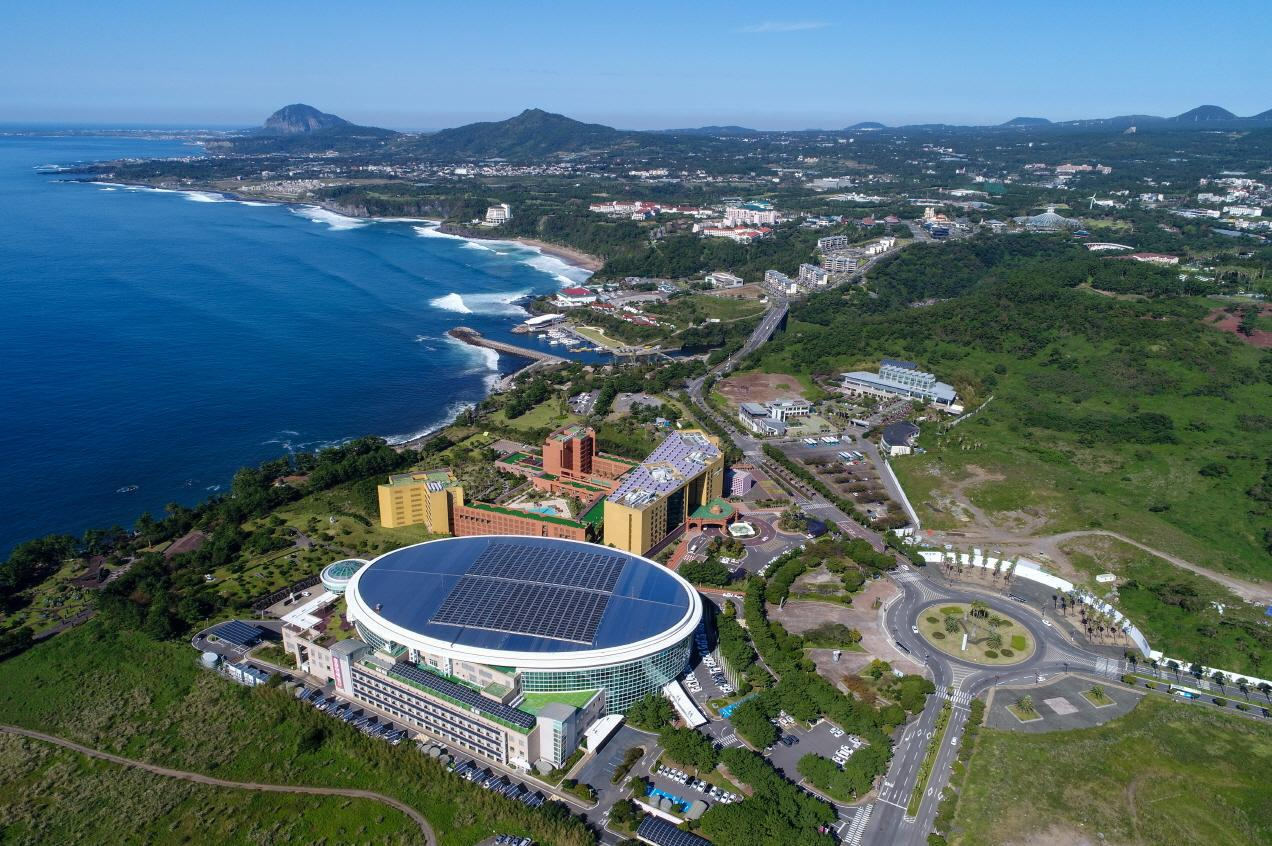
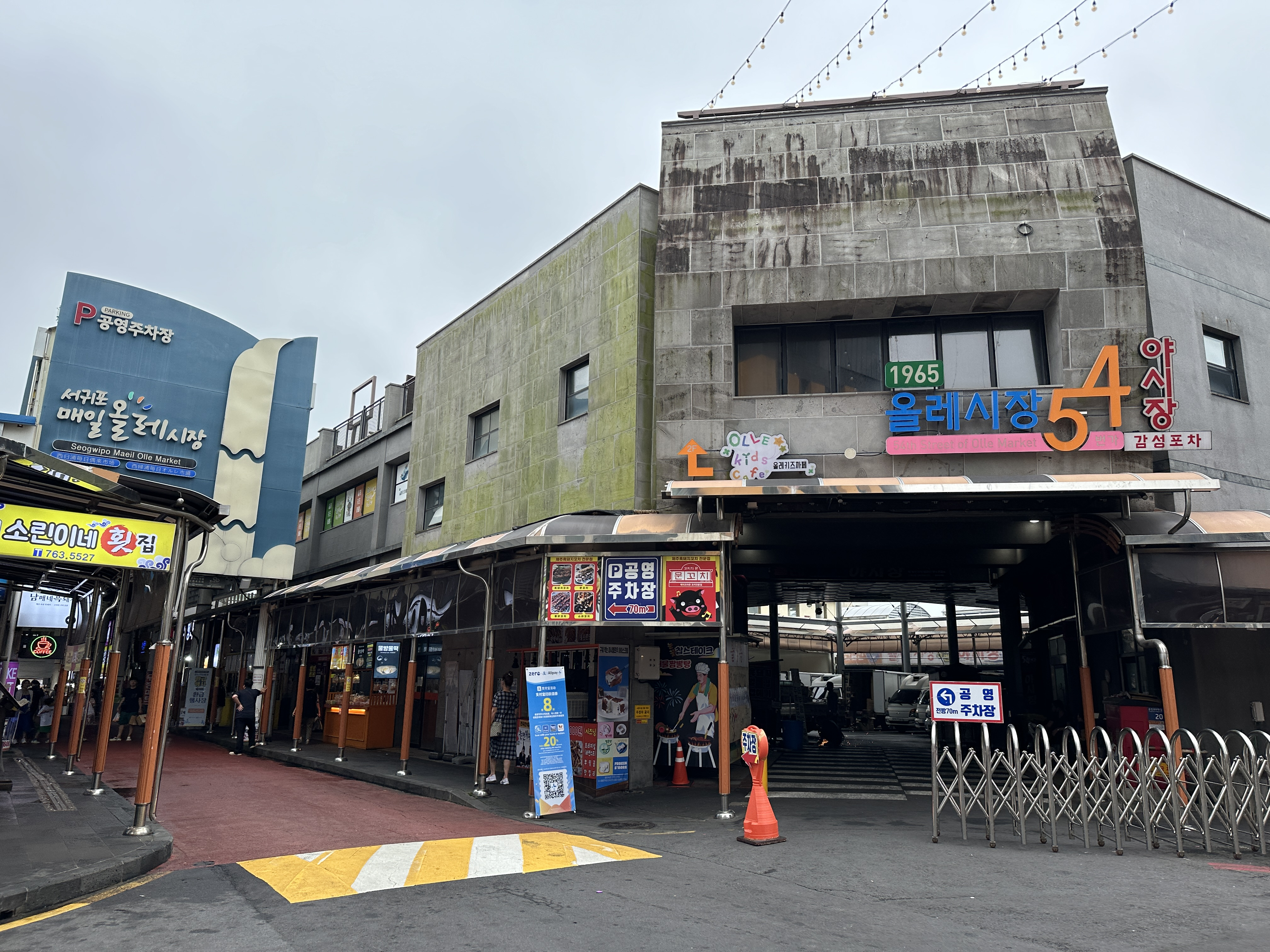
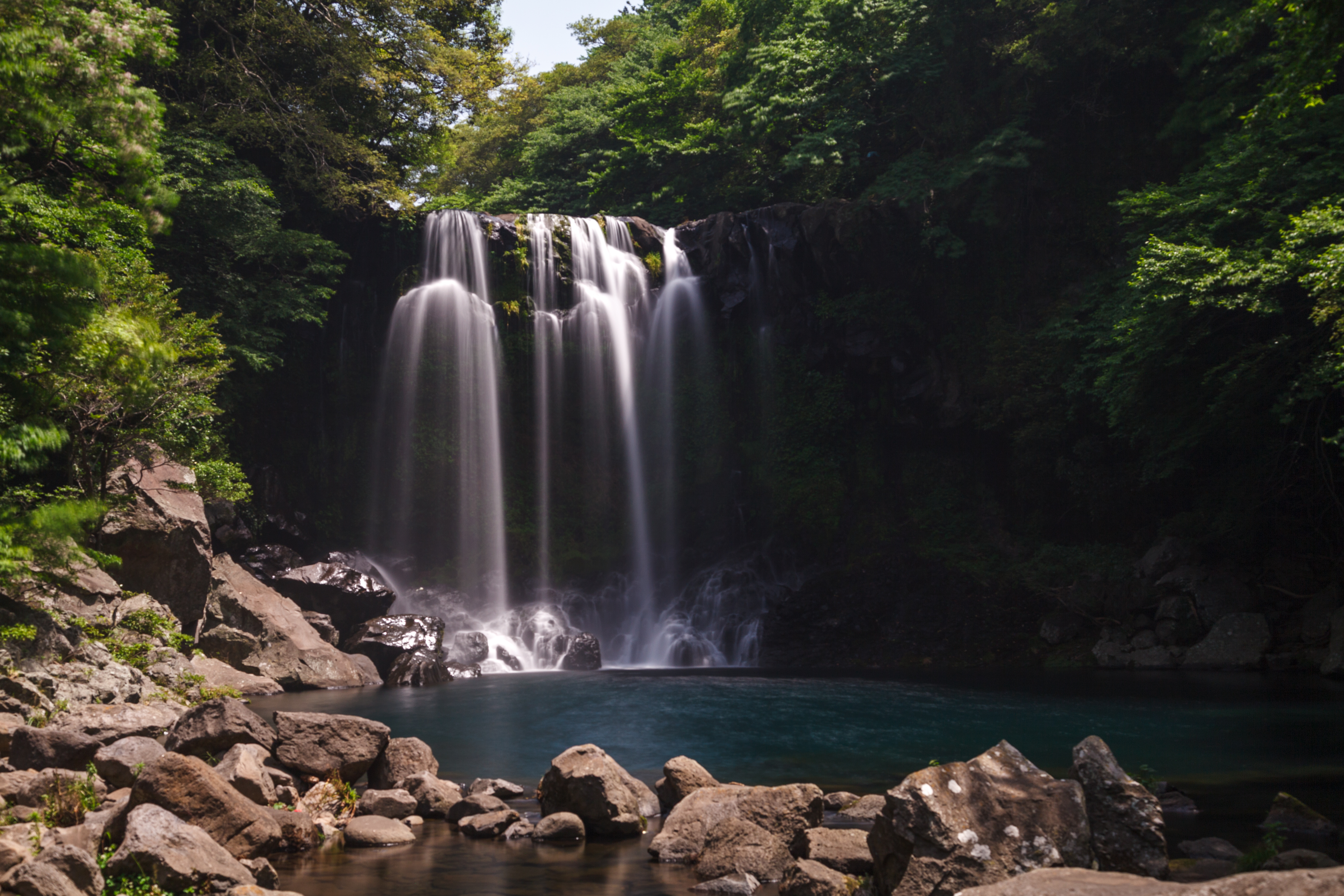
- Seogwipo at dusk Sanbangsan Branksome Hall Asia Shinhwa Shopping Street International Convention Center Jeju Maeil Olle Market Cheonjeyeon Waterfall

- Emblem of Seogwipo (2006-2006)

- Location in South Korea
- Country: South Korea
- Province: Jeju
- Administrative divisions: 12 dong, 3 eup, 2 myeon

Government
  - Type: Mayor appointed by governor, no city council (unique in Korea due to Jeju's autonomy)
  - Mayor: Oh Soon-moon (Independent)

Area
  - Total: 871.52 km^{2} (336.50 sq mi)

Population (2024)
  - Total: 180,909
  - Density: 207.58/km^{2} (537.63/sq mi)
  - Dialect: Jeju
- Website: www.seogwipo.go.kr

Korean name
- Hangul: 서귀포시
- Hanja: 西歸浦市
- RR: Seogwipo-si
- MR: Sŏgwip'o-si

Seogwipo (Korean: 서귀포; Korean pronunciation: [sʌ.ɡwi.pʰo]) is a resort city and the second of the two cities on Jeju Island, covering the southern half of the Jeju Province in South Korea. Settled on a rocky volcanic coastline, it has a population of 180,909 as of 2024.

It has a UNESCO World Heritage Site and was one of the hosts of the 2002 FIFA World Cup.

== History ==
=== Early history ===
Hundreds of Seogwipo's oldest archeological artifacts were found in Saengsugwe Cave near Cheonjiyeon Waterfall on the south coast of Jeju. After an extensive excavation by a team of experts from Jeju National Museum in November 2010, hundred of Stone Age artifacts were unearthed. Another ancient location in Seogwipo is the village of Hamo. Artifacts found there during a 2005 excavation include pieces of earthenware and shell mounds from the Neolithic Age.

In the beginning, Seogwipo was a part of Tamna, an ancient kingdom of Jeju. The kingdom traded with other nations across the Korean peninsula and China during the period of the Three Kingdoms (1st century BCE to 7th century CE). The small port of Seogwipo was used to send tributes to Yuan, an ancient kingdom in China. Tamna briefly reclaimed its independence after the fall of Silla in 935. However, it was subjugated by the Goryeo Dynasty in 938, and officially annexed in 1105. In 1300, among the 14 villages that made up Tamna Prefecture were Hongro and Yerye, two regions of modern Seogwipo. Tamna maintained local autonomy until 1404, when Taejo of the Joseon Dynasty placed it under firm central control. During the Joseon era, three fortresses were built in the Seogwipo area. In 1416, southern Jeju Island was divided into the prefectures of Jeongui and Daejeong. The former included Hongro, and the latter, Yerye, which had been the urban centers of Seogwipo.

=== Modern history ===
In 1914, during the period of Japanese colonial rule, Jeongui prefecture and Daejeong prefecture were merged into Jeju-gun (gun meaning an administrative district bigger than a prefecture), and the two centers of Seogwipo became Jeongui-myeon and Daejeong. In 1915 the names were changed a second time, to U township and Jwa township. In 1935 the two townships were given the names they still have today: Seogwi and Jungmun. Seogwipo was greatly affected by Japanese colonial rule - it was used as a base that supplied marine products, and a whale processing plant was built near the port of Seogwipo. Twelve artificial caves made by the Japanese army still remain along the coast near the hill Sammaebong.

After the end of the colonial period, Seogwipo felt the hardship of the 1948 Jeju uprising and its aftermath. When the Korean War broke out in 1950, Seogwipo port became crowded with thousands of refugees.

After the war, the island was rebuilt. As people's livelihoods stabilized, mandarin orange farming became the most profitable crop for the islanders. The Satsuma mandarin had been brought to Korea from Japan in 1911 by a Catholic missionary named Esmile J. Taque. Few farmers grew mandarins in the 1950s, and the mandarin orange commanded such high prices that mandarin tree was called daehaknamu, meaning "the source of money for college tuition". The government supported mandarin farming from the early 1960s and rapidly increased the number of farms. Now, mandarins from Jeju are a winter staple throughout South Korea.

In the meantime, Seogwipo's status as an administrative district improved. In 1946, the island became Jeju-do (province) and reorganized into Bukjeju-gun to the north of Mt. Halla and Namjeju-gun to the south, which Seogwi-myeon and Jungmun-myeon belonged to. After Jeju-eup (town) became Jeju-si (city) in 1955, Seogwi-myeon became Seogwi-eup in 1956 and was combined with Jungmun-myeon, which created Seogwipo-si and became independent from Namjeju-gun in 1981. In addition, a plan to reorganize the administrative district to combine Jeju-si and Bukjeju-gun, and Seogwipo-si and Namjeju-gun passed through the local referendum in 2005. As a result, Seogwipo City was expanded to cover Namjeju-gun in 2006 and the Jeju Special Self-Governing Province was established.

Modern Seogwipo has changed significantly since its days as a small village, and has renewed itself since Korean War. The Jungmun Tourism Complex is considered a premier Jeju tourist landmark. The Jeju World Cup Stadium welcomed thousands of visitors in 2002 during the South Korean/Japan World Cup. People from all over the world come to the Jeju International Convention Center in Jungmun for conventions. The Jeju Olle trails along the Seogwipo coast are most popular among hikers.

== Climate ==
Seogwipo has a humid subtropical climate (Köppen: Cfa), similar to nearby southwestern Japan.

Climate data for Jeongbang-dong, Seogwipo (1991–2020 normals, extremes 1961–present)
Month	Jan	Feb	Mar	Apr	May	Jun	Jul	Aug	Sep	Oct	Nov	Dec	Year
Record high °C (°F)	20.7 (69.3)	23.6 (74.5)	23.8 (74.8)	28.5 (83.3)	30.4 (86.7)	31.5 (88.7)	35.8 (96.4)	35.9 (96.6)	34.8 (94.6)	31.7 (89.1)	28.0 (82.4)	21.9 (71.4)	35.9 (96.6)
Mean daily maximum °C (°F)	10.8 (51.4)	11.8 (53.2)	14.7 (58.5)	18.6 (65.5)	22.3 (72.1)	24.7 (76.5)	28.3 (82.9)	30.1 (86.2)	27.4 (81.3)	23.5 (74.3)	18.4 (65.1)	13.1 (55.6)	20.3 (68.5)
Daily mean °C (°F)	7.2 (45.0)	8.2 (46.8)	11.0 (51.8)	15.0 (59.0)	18.8 (65.8)	21.8 (71.2)	25.7 (78.3)	27.2 (81.0)	24.1 (75.4)	19.6 (67.3)	14.6 (58.3)	9.4 (48.9)	16.9 (62.4)
Mean daily minimum °C (°F)	4.1 (39.4)	4.8 (40.6)	7.5 (45.5)	11.6 (52.9)	15.8 (60.4)	19.5 (67.1)	23.8 (74.8)	24.9 (76.8)	21.5 (70.7)	16.4 (61.5)	11.2 (52.2)	6.2 (43.2)	13.9 (57.0)
Record low °C (°F)	−6.4 (20.5)	−6.3 (20.7)	−4.4 (24.1)	0.2 (32.4)	7.2 (45.0)	11.9 (53.4)	14.8 (58.6)	16.8 (62.2)	12.2 (54.0)	6.8 (44.2)	0.0 (32.0)	−4.1 (24.6)	−6.4 (20.5)
Average precipitation mm (inches)	60.7 (2.39)	77.9 (3.07)	130.3 (5.13)	187.0 (7.36)	223.6 (8.80)	267.6 (10.54)	275.8 (10.86)	315.7 (12.43)	208.8 (8.22)	100.4 (3.95)	86.2 (3.39)	55.6 (2.19)	1,989.6 (78.33)
Average precipitation days (≥ 0.1 mm)	9.8	9.6	10.5	10.1	10.7	12.8	13.8	14.3	10.9	5.8	8.1	8.9	125.3
Average snowy days	3.8	2.4	0.8	0.0	0.0	0.0	0.0	0.0	0.0	0.0	0.1	3.1	10.2
Average relative humidity (%)	63.0	62.5	62.4	65.2	70.6	80.7	86.1	80.9	73.6	64.8	64.7	63.2	69.8
Mean monthly sunshine hours	153.5	157.4	185.8	196.5	203.5	136.3	144.8	187.7	174.7	208.8	166.8	158.8	2,074.6
Percentage possible sunshine	48.0	49.2	46.9	48.9	46.3	33.6	32.5	44.5	47.4	58.8	54.3	52.1	46.2
Source: Korea Meteorological Administration (percent sunshine 1981–2010)

Climate data for Seongsan-eup, Seogwipo (1991–2020 normals, extremes 1971–present)
Month	Jan	Feb	Mar	Apr	May	Jun	Jul	Aug	Sep	Oct	Nov	Dec	Year
Record high °C (°F)	20.9 (69.6)	22.3 (72.1)	22.7 (72.9)	28.1 (82.6)	30.6 (87.1)	31.8 (89.2)	36.2 (97.2)	35.5 (95.9)	33.3 (91.9)	30.1 (86.2)	25.7 (78.3)	22.1 (71.8)	36.2 (97.2)
Mean daily maximum °C (°F)	8.9 (48.0)	10.1 (50.2)	13.6 (56.5)	18.0 (64.4)	21.9 (71.4)	24.2 (75.6)	28.1 (82.6)	29.7 (85.5)	26.5 (79.7)	22.0 (71.6)	16.7 (62.1)	11.2 (52.2)	19.2 (66.6)
Daily mean °C (°F)	5.4 (41.7)	6.3 (43.3)	9.5 (49.1)	13.8 (56.8)	17.7 (63.9)	20.9 (69.6)	25.1 (77.2)	26.5 (79.7)	23.2 (73.8)	18.2 (64.8)	12.7 (54.9)	7.5 (45.5)	15.6 (60.1)
Mean daily minimum °C (°F)	2.1 (35.8)	2.5 (36.5)	5.2 (41.4)	9.4 (48.9)	13.7 (56.7)	17.9 (64.2)	22.6 (72.7)	23.9 (75.0)	20.2 (68.4)	14.5 (58.1)	8.8 (47.8)	3.9 (39.0)	12.1 (53.8)
Record low °C (°F)	−7.0 (19.4)	−6.4 (20.5)	−4.7 (23.5)	−1.3 (29.7)	1.7 (35.1)	8.2 (46.8)	13.7 (56.7)	16.2 (61.2)	10.4 (50.7)	3.2 (37.8)	−0.6 (30.9)	−4.0 (24.8)	−7.0 (19.4)
Average precipitation mm (inches)	77.5 (3.05)	83.2 (3.28)	139.4 (5.49)	161.3 (6.35)	178.0 (7.01)	231.9 (9.13)	271.3 (10.68)	343.2 (13.51)	248.6 (9.79)	114.0 (4.49)	102.8 (4.05)	78.8 (3.10)	2,030 (79.92)
Average precipitation days (≥ 0.1 mm)	11.0	9.8	10.4	9.4	9.8	12.8	12.7	13.3	10.8	6.3	9.0	10.1	125.4
Average snowy days	6.1	3.7	0.7	0.1	0.0	0.0	0.0	0.0	0.0	0.0	0.2	3.8	14.6
Average relative humidity (%)	67.4	65.5	65.4	67.4	72.2	82.6	85.6	81.5	76.3	69.4	68.7	67.7	72.5
Mean monthly sunshine hours	128.6	145.5	181.5	198.0	208.7	141.1	160.3	192.6	167.2	192.0	156.7	134.7	2,006.9
Percentage possible sunshine	38.7	47.3	45.8	49.4	47.7	33.8	35.9	44.0	44.5	55.0	49.6	42.1	44.2
Source: Korea Meteorological Administration (snow and percent sunshine 1981–2010)

== Demographics ==
Historical population
Year	Pop.	±%
1970	140,980	—
1980	172,825	+22.6%
1990	173,123	+0.2%
2000	145,896	−15.7%
2010	130,713	−10.4%
2020	178,552	+36.6%
Source: MODS

As of 2024, Seogwipo has a population of 180,909, of which 51.0% are male and 49.0% are female, compared to the national average of 50.1% and 49.9% respectively. People under 15 years old make up 11.6% of the population, and people over 65 years old make up 22.1%, compared to the national average of 10.5% and 19.5% respectively. Foreigners make up 5.6% of the total population, compared to 3.9% nationwide.

=== Religion ===
As of 2015, 25.5% of the population follow Buddhism, 17.4% follow Christianity (of which 11.6% Protestantism and 5.8% Catholicism), 0.7% follow other religions and 56.4% are irreligious.

== Organizations ==
Branksome Hall Asia is a school located in Seogwipo.

== Tourism ==
Seogwipo's atmosphere is similar to other Korean seaside towns - old love motels and old businesses. However, it also has lush gardens and citrus farms that are bordered with black rock fences. The whole town is small enough for people to walk across easily. The Olle Market in downtown Seogwipo is a traditional daily market. There is also much to see and eat along Lee Joong-seop Street, Myeongdong Road, Arang Joeul Street, and Chilsimni Food Street.

=== Tourist attractions ===
Seongeup Folk Village is a traditional village that has been continually inhabited since at latest the 15th century. It has many traditional hanok, and offers traditional experiences and performances.

The museum, which first opened in September 2001, is widely known in Korea. At the O'Sulloc Tea Museum, not only can visitor enjoy unique O'Sulloc teas, but they can relax next to the lotus pond in the indoor garden. The second floor of the building has an observatory, so visitors can enjoy the views of the nearby green tea fields and the surrounding landscape.

The Citrus Museum is located in the city. It offers citrus picking experiences for part of the year.

Daeyoo Land opened in 1978 as a hunting ground and shooting range and recently opened an ATV (All-Terrain Vehicle) track. It includes a pistol range, rifle ranges, clay pigeon shooting, and an ATV track.

Cheonjiyeon, meaning "God's pond", derives its name from the legend that the seven fairies serving the King of Heaven came down to the pond on stairs of cloud and bathed in its clean waters.

Jeongbang Waterfall is the only waterfall in Asia that falls directly into the ocean. On the wall of the water fall, there is an inscription written "Seobulgwacha," referring to Seobul passing by this place. Seobul was a servant of the Chinese Emperor Jin (BC 259~210) who was ordered by the Emperor to find the substance that would make him immortal. Seogwipo is also said to have gotten its name to mean Seobul headed back west.

Seongsan Ilchulbong rose from under the sea in a volcanic eruption over 100,000 years ago. There is a huge crater at the top of the mountain.

Moseulpo Port is reputed for its seafood, particularly Japanese amberjack (방어; bangeo). It holds a festival dedicated to the fish each year, around late November. The port also maintains routes to Gapado, a small island off the southern coast of Jeju.

Seogwipo Submarine offers undersea tours in a submarine from Finland. Munseom, where the submarine travels, is home to coral reefs, schools of fish, and seaweed.

Yeomiji Botanical Garden is located in the city, inside Jungmun Tourism Complex.

Saeseom is an island in the harbor of the city proper, which has walking trails and a light and water show at its bridge in the evenings.

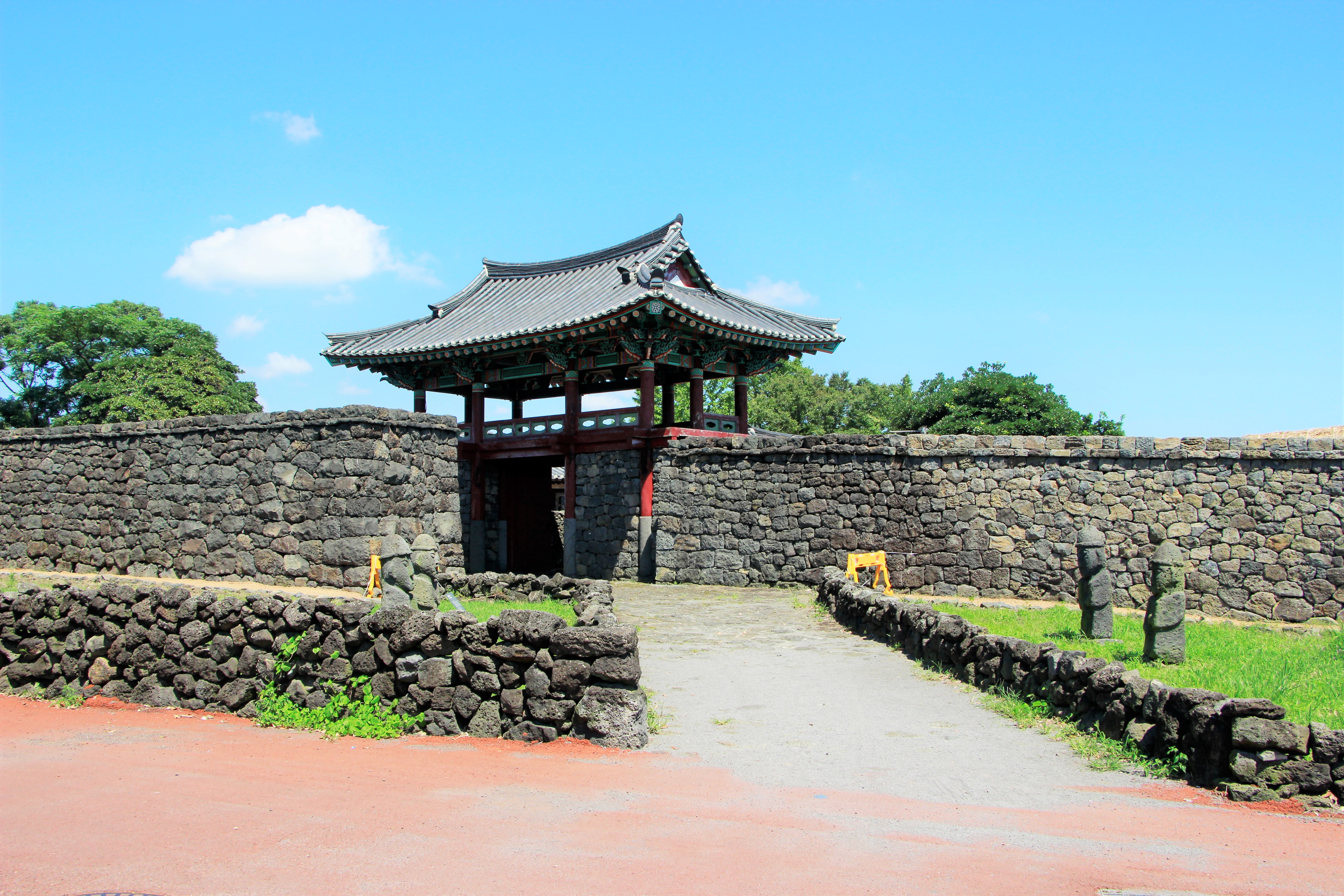
Seongeup Folk Village

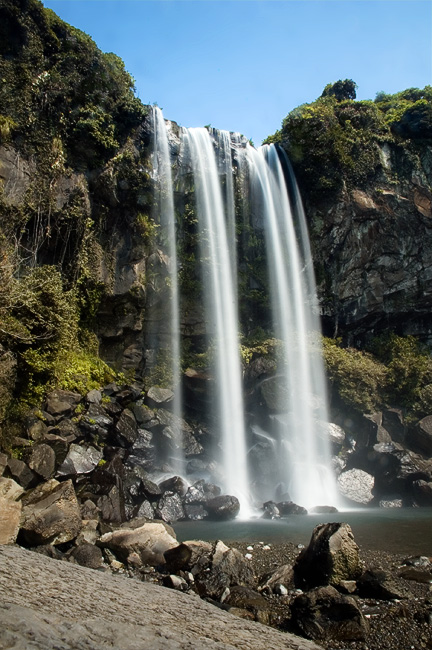
Jeongbang Waterfall

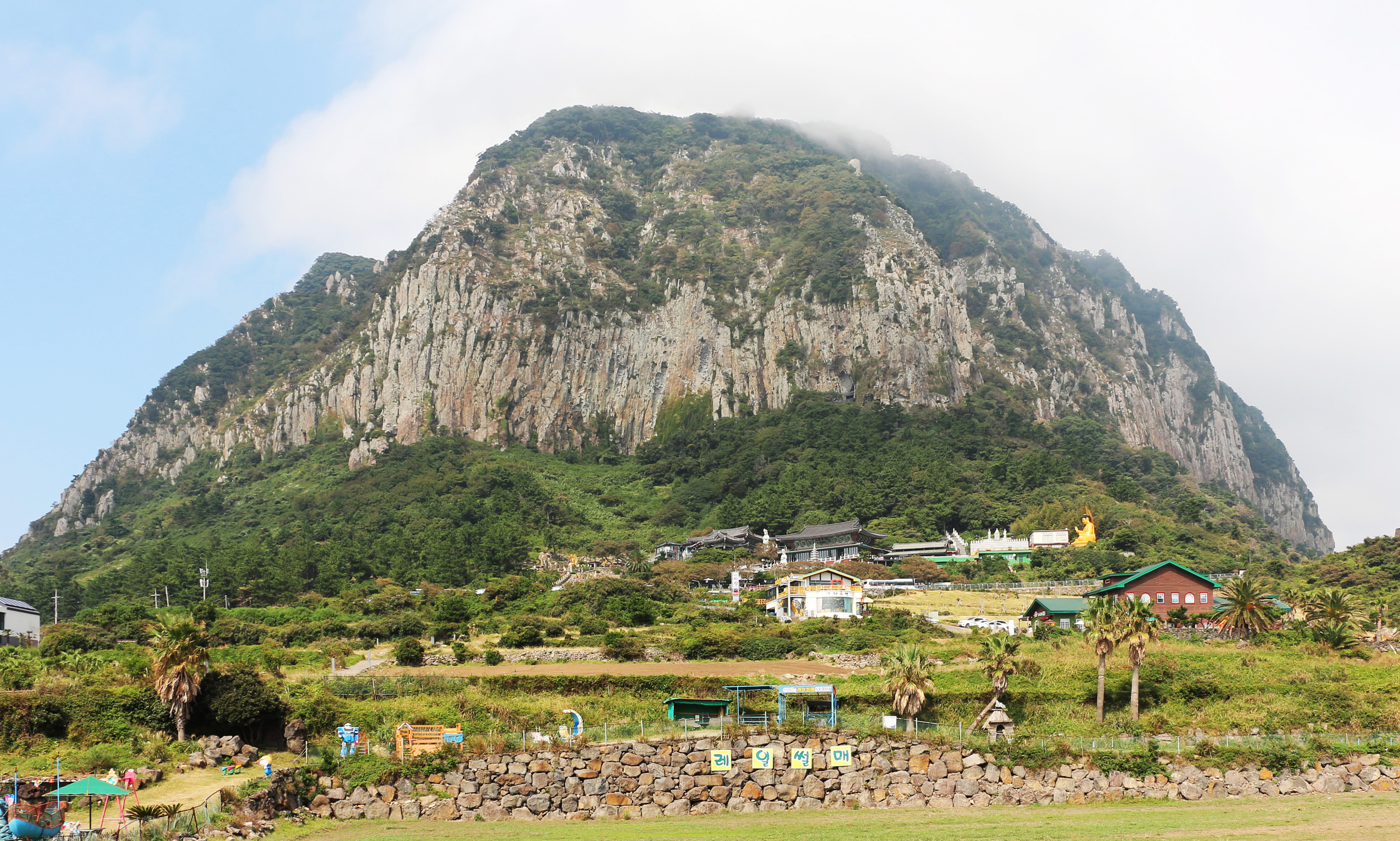
Sanbangsan

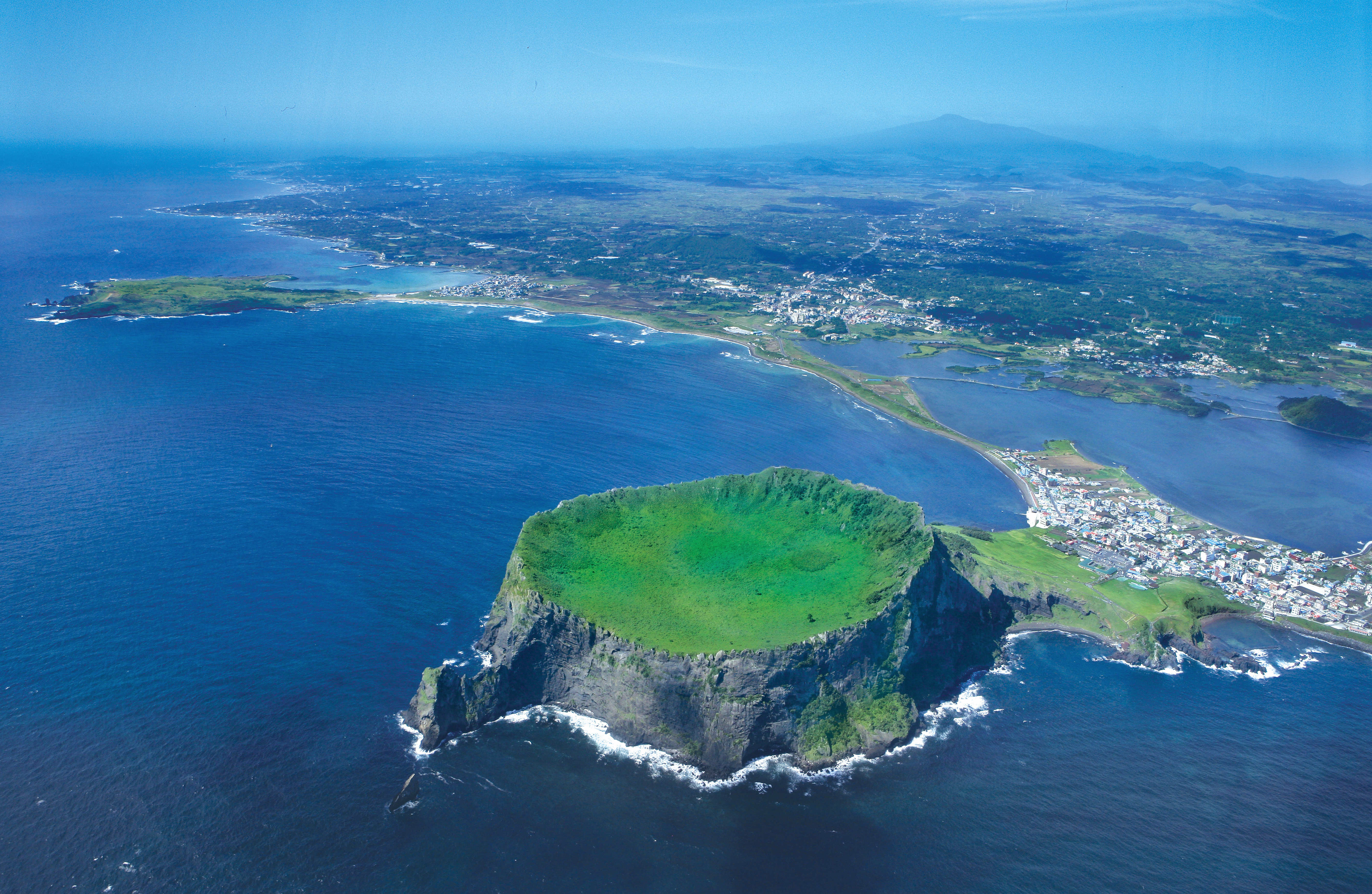
Seongsan Ilchulbong

== Sports ==
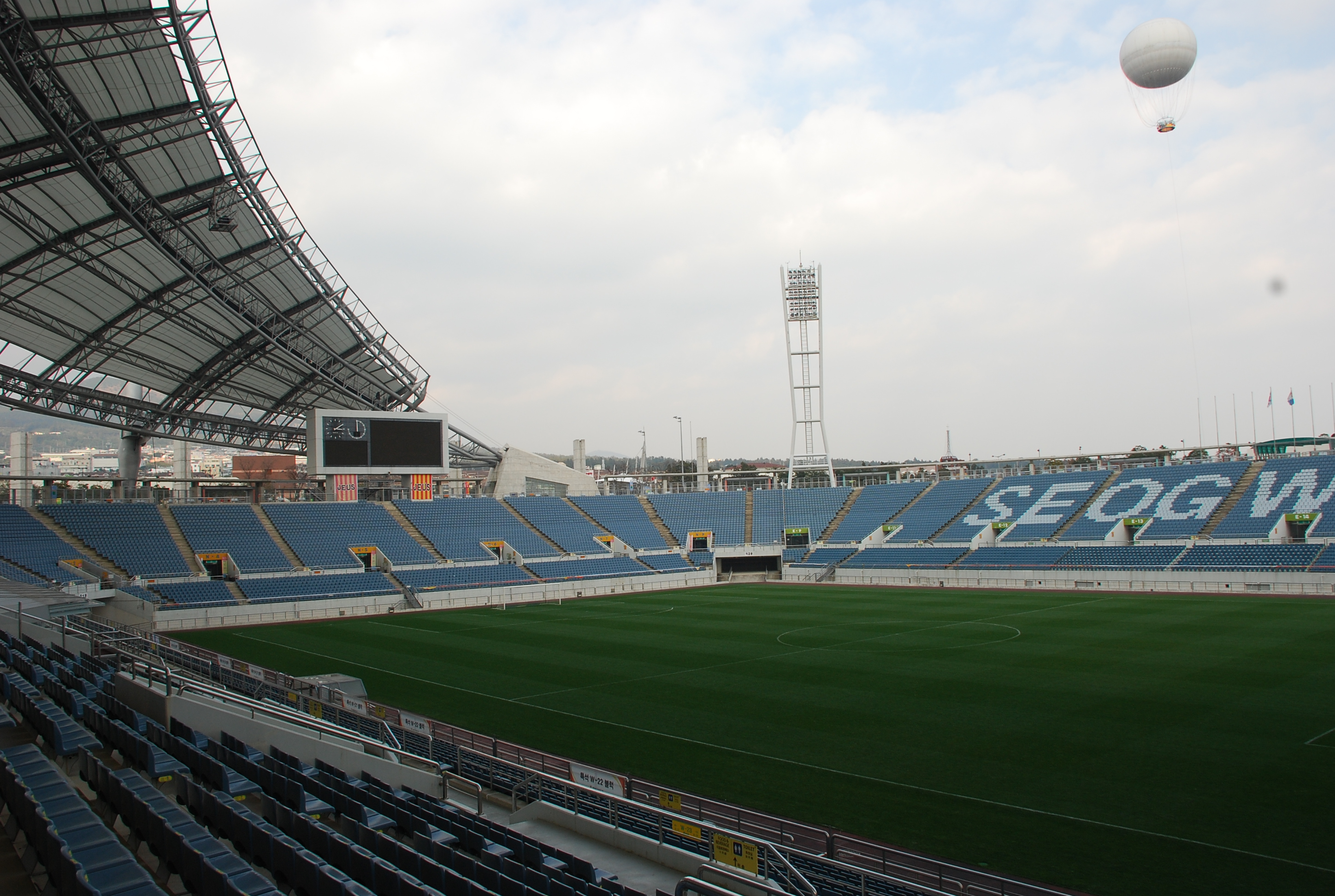
Jeju World Cup Stadium

Seogwipo is the home city of K League 1 club Jeju SK (known as Jeju United until 2025). The club's home stadium is Jeju World Cup Stadium, located in the southern part of Seogwipo.

== Sister cities ==
- – Kashima, Ibaraki, Japan (since November 2003)
- – Salinas, California, United States (since 2018)

== See also ==
- List of cities in South Korea
