= Multiracial people in South Korea =

South Koreans of multiracial descent

- Hangul: 혼혈
- Hanja: 混血
- Lit.: mixed blood
- RR: honhyeol
- MR: honhyŏl

Multiracial people in South Korea, or Multiracial South Koreans (Korean: 혼혈), are residents or citizens of South Korea who are of partial Korean descent, often born to one Korean parent and one non-Korean parent.

== History ==
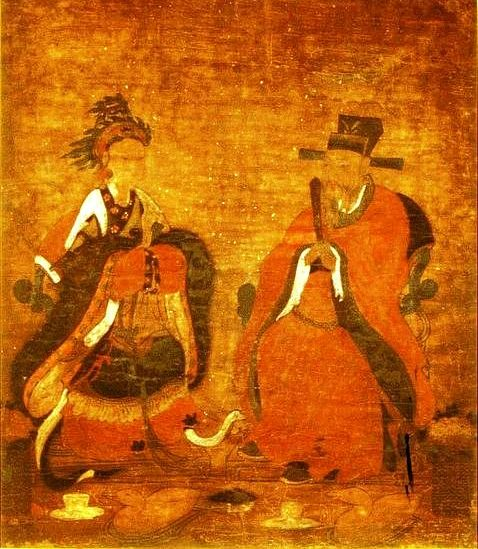
Princess Noguk of the Mongol-lead Yuan dynasty, pictured with King Gongmin, married into Goryeo nobility.

While intermarriage occurred between Goryeo royals and leading families of the Yuan court during Mongol rule from the 13th century, a persistent concept of Korea as ethnically and culturally homogenous has prevailed in Korea, and continues as Korean ethnic nationalism. Multiracial non-royal individuals have lived in Korea since at least the Joseon period, with one of that era's best-known cases being the first descendants of the Byeongyeong Nam clan, founded by a Dutchman who accompanied Hendrik Hamel. Centuries later, the population of multiracial Koreans, in particular "Amerasian" war babies, rose drastically during and shortly after the Korean War.

Since the mid-2010s, South Korea has seen a rise in interracial relationships between native Koreans and foreign residents and subsequent births of multiracial children. It is believed that this phenomenon is a result of the popularization of South Korean media abroad (Korean Wave), and its ongoing population crisis.

== Terminology ==
=== In South Korea ===
- 혼혈 Honhyeol – "혼혈(混血)" is a term that means "mixed blood". It is the most common term used for mixed Koreans. It can be paired with a country and the word 혼혈 to reflect a person's specific heritage.
  - 중국 혼혈 Jungguk-honhyeol – Chinese-Koreans
  - 일본 혼혈 Ilbon-honhyeol – Japanese-Koreans
  - 백인 혼혈 Baegin-honhyeol – White Koreans
  - 흑인 혼혈 Heugin-honhyeol – Black Koreans
- 혼혈아 Honhyeora — Korean reading of Chinese 混血儿/混血兒 hùnxué'èr
- 반반이 Banbani – "Halfie", considered outdated and offensive
- 하프 Hapeu – "Half", borrowed directly from English, outdated and offensive
- 잡종 Chapjong – "Mongrel", outdated and offensive, used mostly in North Korea (Note: Miscegenation is illegal in North Korea; there are no known North Koreans of a multiracial or multicultural background.)
- 튀기 Twigi — "Fried", outdated and offensive

== Social perception ==
=== Race in South Korea ===
Race (Hanja: 人種, Korean: 인종 injong) is the categorization of various human groups based on arbitrary phenotypical features or cultural attributions. Race is a social construct that is ever-changing. While nowadays social constructs of race, gender, or sexual orientation have been influenced by European or American ("Western") sociological frameworks, this was not always the case. Early ideas on race or distinction between peoples in East Asia was greatly influenced by Chinese ideology and philosophy, such as the Hua-Yi distinction. According to Hua-Yi, Chinese civilization and those in its periphery, such as Korea, Japan, or Vietnam, were considered to be "civilized", while those outside of China's periphery were considered "barbarians". Although this framework on race was heavily Sinocentric, it persisted in the region until the Early Modern period.

In more contemporary times, racial frameworks in South Korea have been greatly influenced by the United States, like with many other aspects of South Korean culture and society.

=== Discrimination and social stigma ===
The Korean Peninsula has historically been homogenous; the predominant ethnic group in both North Korea and South Korea is Koreans. However, rising rates of foreign-born residents such as expats and immigrants has led to a demographic shift in the country. Most foreign residents in South Korea are foreign nationals of Korean ancestry (Gyopo) from China, Central and Southeast Asia.; "Black Koreans" (흑인 혼혈 heugin-honhyeol) and "White Koreans" (백인 혼혈 baegin-honhyeol) are far less common, in comparison. The vast majority of intermarriages in South Korea are intercultural, not interracial, with other Asian countries such as Taiwan, Philippines, Vietnam, Thailand, and Mongolia accounting for the vast majority of intermarriages between Koreans and non-Koreans. In regards to interracial marriages, European, North American, and broadly “Western” countries such as France, Turkiye, the United States, Canada, and Australia are within the top twenty. International marriages account for one tenth of all marriages in the country. Nationwide, metropolitain areas, including Seoul, Busan, Incheon, and Gwangju account for the majority of intermarriage rate; on a provincial level excluding the Seoul Capital Area (including Gyeonggi Province), Gangwon, North and South Chungcheong, and North and South Jeolla provinces have all reported an increase in intermarriages and births.

South Korea is one of the few developed countries to not have anti-discrimination laws, which leaves minority groups, including multiracial or multicultural South Koreans and their families susceptible to discrimination and social ostricization. However, the common sentiment among monoracial South Koreans is neutrality and apathy. Whenever media, corporations, or individuals express racist or xenophobic rhetoric, it is dismissed under the excuse of East Asia being "isolated", or racism in South Korea not being "as bad" as it is in other countries. The lived reality of multiracial individuals and their families contradicts this, however. Cases of bullying, workplace discrimination, and physical assault.

== Notable people ==
=== South Korean-born ===
- Insooni (born 1957), South Korean singer — African American and Korean
- Han Hyun-min (born 2001), South Korean model and actor — Nigerian and Korean
- Jin Hyeon-ju (born 2001), South Korean singer — Filipina and Korean
- Nancy (born 2001), South Korean siger — Irish-American and Korean
- Bae Yujin (born 2002), South Korean model — Nigerian and Korean
- Jenny Park (born 2006), South Korean model — Nigerian and Korean

=== Foreign-born ===
- Stephen Park, lawyer and businessman — Unspecified European and Korean
- Hines Ward (born 1976), American football coach — African American and Korean
- Yoon Mi-rae (born 1981), American singer — African American and Korean descent
- Michelle Lee (born 1991), South Korean singer — African American and Korean descent
- AleXa (born in 1996), American singer based in South Korea — Russian-American and Korean
- Vernon (Choi Han-sol, born 1998), South Korean singer and member of boy band Seventeen — American and Korean
- Jeon Somi (born 2001), Canadian and South Korean singer — Dutch-Canadian and Korean
- Kyla (born in 2001), South Korean singer (American and Korean descent)
- Huening Kai (Jung Hawon, born 2002), South Korean singer (American and Korean descent)
- Lily (born in 2002), Australian-born singer (Anglo-Australian and Korean descent)
- Danielle (born in 2005), Australian-born singer (Australian and Korean descent)
- Ella Gross (born in 2008), American singer based in South Korea (German-American and Korean descent)

== See also ==
- Multiracial people
  - Afro-Asians — People of mixed Sub-Saharan African and Asian descent.
  - Hāfu – Person of partial Japanese ancestry
  - Kopino – Term for mixed Korean-Filipino people
  - Zainichi Koreans – Japanese citizens or residents who are ethnically Korean
- Chinese people in Korea — Chinese diaspora in either the DPRK as well as Republic of Korea or North Koreans and South Koreans of full or partial Chinese descent.
- Filipinos in South Korea
- Japanese people in South Korea
- Mongolians in South Korea
- Globalization in South Korea
- Multiculturalism in South Korea
- Multicultural families in South Korea
