= Dutch Korean =

Dutch(-)Korean or Korean(-)Dutch may be:

- Persons with multiple citizenship of the Netherlands and North or South Korea
- Dutch people in Korea
- Koreans in the Netherlands
- Netherlands–North Korea relations
- Netherlands–South Korea relations
