= List of KLM Delft Blue houses =

List of Delft Blue houses that KLM presents to its Business Class passengers

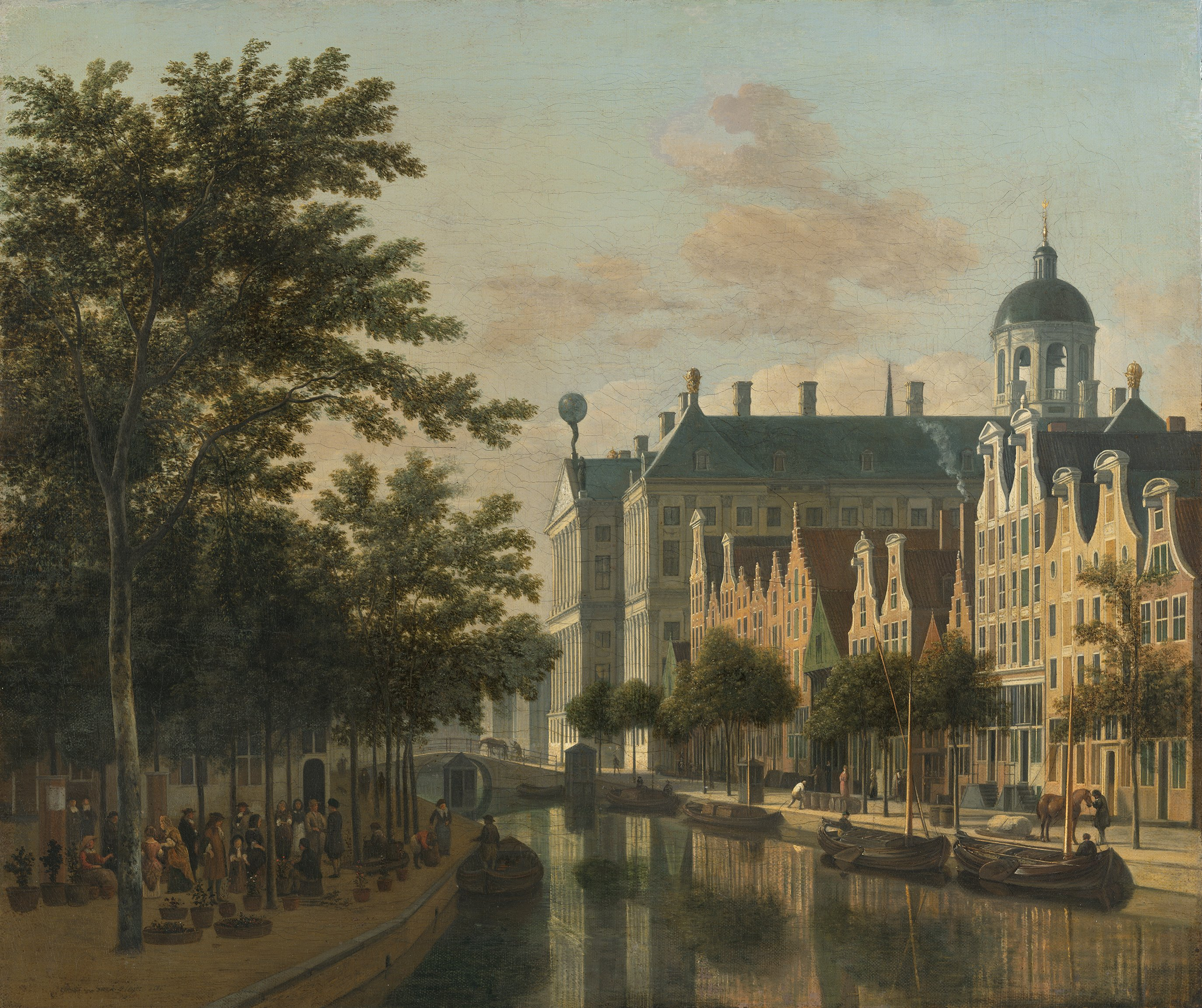
Nieuwezijds Voorburgwal, Amsterdam, circa 1686 CE

Below is a list of Delft Blue houses that KLM has presented to all of its World Business Class passengers since the 1950s. Until 1994, the houses were issued irregularly. Since 1994, a new house has been presented each year on October 7, the anniversary of KLM's founding in 1919.

== Collector's items ==
1. Frans Hals Museum, Groot Heiligland 62, Haarlem - 1962
2. Royal Palace, Nieuwezijds Voorburgwal 147, Amsterdam - first issue 1986
3. De Waag ('The Weigh House'), Markt 35, Gouda - first issue 1997
4. House of Bols, Paulus Potterstraat 14, Amsterdam - 2007
5. Ridderzaal ('Hall of Knights'), Binnenhof 10, The Hague - 2008
6. Huis ter Kleef, Kleverlaan 9, Haarlem - 2009
7. Concertgebouw, Concertgebouwplein 1, Amsterdam - 2014
8. Carré Theatre, Amstel 115–125, Amsterdam - 2014
9. Het Loo Palace, Koninklijk Park 1, Apeldoorn - 2014
10. Nederlands Scheepvaartmuseum (National Maritime Museum), Kattenburgerplein 1, Amsterdam - 2016

== Collection ==
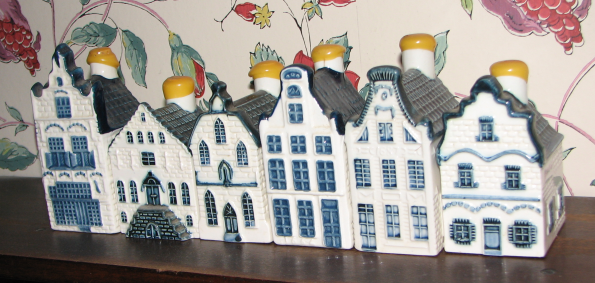
Selection of KLM Delft Blue houses

year	number	house	address	town	built	commentary
1952	1	unidentified				
1952	2	Restaurant d'Vijff Vlieghen (The Five Flies)	Spuistraat 294	Amsterdam	1627	
1952	3	unidentified				
1952	4	unidentified				
1952	5	unidentified				
1955	6	former St-Petrus House	Achter het Hofplein	Middelburg	1530	The St-Petrus House is demolished; in other places, i.a. in the KLM Delft Blue houses app, it is said that “Het Houten Huys” (The Wooden House, Begijnhof 34, Amsterdam) would have been the model for this house. This is unlikely for several reasons.
1956	7	unidentified				
1957	8	Int Slodt van Egmond	Oudezijds Voorburgwal 18	Amsterdam	1615	
1958	9		Leidsegracht 10	Amsterdam	1665	
1959	10	De Gecroonde Raep (The Crowned Turnip)	Oudezijds Voorburgwal 57	Amsterdam	1615	
1960	11	Proeflokaal Wynand Fockink (Tasting House Wynand Fockink	Pijlsteeg 31	Amsterdam	1689	this house is also issued as number 23
1960	12		Zandhoek 4-6	Amsterdam	1658	
1960	13	D´Gekroonde Bye-korf (The Crowned Beehive)	Kamp 10	Amersfoort	1687	
1960	14	Daer de twee Zeegooden op de gevel liggen (Where the two Sea gods lie on the façade)	Herengracht 510	Amsterdam	1665	
1960	15	De Rozijnkorf (The Raisin Basket)	Voorstraat 282	Dordrecht	1550	
1961	16		Houtmarkt 17	Haarlem	1735	
1961	17	Orphanage	Spieringstraat 1-3	Gouda	1642	this house is also issued as number 25
1962	18	Klein Fresenburg	Oude Gracht 111	Utrecht	1569	
1962	19	house of Herman Boerhaave	Rapenburg 31	Leiden	1664	
1962	20	Edam Museum	Damplein 8	Edam	1530	
1963	21	De Salamander	Markt 47	Delft	1620	
1963	22	Het Lammeken (The Little Lamb)	Kaai 25	Veere	1540	Museum De Schotse Huizen (the Scottish houses)
1964	23	Proeflokaal Wynand Fockink (Tasting House Wynand Fockink)	Pijlsteeg 31	Amsterdam	1689	this house is also issued as number 11
1965	24	De Kroon (The Crown)	Mient 31	Alkmaar	1546	
1966	25	Orphanage	Spieringstraat 1-3	Gouda	1642	this house is also issued as number 17
1966	26	Mata Hari’s love nest	Nieuwe Uitleg 16	The Hague	1900	
1966	27	Prinsenhof (Princes Court)	Nieuwe Have 59	Rotterdam	1715	
1966	28	In Duizend Vreezen (In thousand fears)	Groote Markt 2a	Rotterdam	1570	
1966	29	Stadstimmerwerf (city lumber yard)	Kort Galgewater 21	Leiden	1612	
1967	30		Hippolytusbuurt 26	Delft	1612	Tibet Shop
1967	31		Koornmarkt 87	Delft	1916	building in a strict traditional style influenced by the work of H.P. Berlage, designed by E.H. Luxemburg
1967	32	brouwerij De Handtbooch (brewery The Longbow)	Koornmarkt 81	Delft	1540	
1969	33	De Dubbelde Palmboom (the Doubled Palm tree)	Voorhaven 12	Rotterdam	1824	
1969	34	Het Gulden Tonneke (The Golden Cask	Wijnhaven 16	Delft	ca 1540	
1969	35	Oost-Indisch Huis (East India House)	Oude Delft 39	Delft	1631	
1969	36		Hippolytusbuurt 8	Delft	1690	restaurant Le Mariage
1970	37	Stadsbank van Lening	Oudezijds Voorburgwal 300	Amsterdam	1550	
1971	38		Herengracht 607	Amsterdam	1670	
1972	39		Nieuweweg 12	Hindeloopen	1620	
1972	40	De Rode Hoed (Vrijburg)	Keizersgracht 104	Amsterdam	1642	
1972	41		Sint Jacobsstraat 13	Leeuwarden	1636	
1972	42		Prinsengracht 514	Amsterdam	1720	
1973	43		Prinsengracht 516	Amsterdam	1879	
1973	44	Heilige Geest of Arme Wees- en Kinderhuis (Holy Spirit or Poor Orphans and Children's House	Hooglandse Kerkgracht 19	Leiden	1626	
1973	45		Keizersgracht 140	Amsterdam	1897	until 1824 in use with the English Quakers
1974	46		Begijnhof 27	Amsterdam	1740	
1975	47	Anne Frank House	Prinsengracht 263	Amsterdam	1850	
1976	48	Rembrandt House Museum	Joodenbreestraat 4	Amsterdam	1627	
1980	49		Friesestraat 42	Coevorden	1765	former barracks in use as a cafe
1983	50		Rozengracht 106	Amsterdam	1650	in 1983 Bols Taveerne
1984	51	Valckeniershuys	Voorstraat 51	Franeker	1662	
1985	52		Herengracht 415	Amsterdam	1891	
1985	53		Herengracht 203	Amsterdam	1618	
1985	54	Warehouse Frankfort	Prinsengracht 773	Amsterdam	1671	
1987	55	Zakkendragershuisje (Bags carriers house)	Oude Sluis 19	Schiedam	1725	
1988	56	De Werelt (The World)	Herengracht 64	Amsterdam	1617	
1988	57	De Ster (The Star)	Herengracht 95	Amsterdam	1768	
1989	58		Herengracht 101	Amsterdam	1871	
1989	59	't Hochemer Voedervat (Hochemer feed vessel)	Herengracht 163	Amsterdam	1721	
1990	60		Herengracht 314	Amsterdam	1674	
1994	61		Keizersgracht 439	Amsterdam	1895	
1994	62		Prinsengracht 305	Amsterdam	1616	
1994	63		Keizersgracht 407	Amsterdam	1665	
1994	64	Coach house	Keizersgracht 755	Amsterdam	1700	
1994	65	Pakhuis De Sparreboom (Spruce Tree Warehouse)	Keizersgracht 487	Amsterdam	1670	
1994	66	Warehouse Maarseveen	Keizersgracht 403	Amsterdam	1669	
1994	67		Prinsengracht 721	Amsterdam	1750	
1994	68		Prinsengracht 969	Amsterdam	1690	
1994	69		Keizersgracht 319	Amsterdam	1639	
1994	70	Cheese warehouse	Koningsstraat 4	Alkmaar	1891	
1994	71		Singel 81	Amsterdam	1874	
1994	72		Singel 87	Amsterdam	1730	
1994	73	De Posthoorn (The Post horn)	Dijk 11	Alkmaar	1575	
1994	74		Reguliersgracht 7	Amsterdam	1739	
1994	75	former KLM headquarters	Hofweg 9-11	The Hague	1913	build as fashion store Meddens after a design by H.P. Berlage in 1914
1995	76	The Little Street	Vlamingstraat 42	Delft	1550	after the painting of Johannes Vermeer from ca 1658, Rijksmuseum
1996	77	De Arend	Schoolstraat 2	Breda	1560	
1997	78		Leidsegracht 51	Amsterdam	1671	
1998	79	De Locomotief (the Locomotive)	Lange Haven 74-76	Schiedam	1671	Jenevermuseum (gin museum)
1999	80	De Drie Fleschjes (the three flasks)	Gravenstraat 18	Amsterdam	1650	
2000	81	Gold Office	Waagplein 1	Groningen	1635	
2001	82	Huys op de Jeker	Bonnefantenstraat 5	Maastricht	1665	
2002	83	Museum Van Loon	Keizersgracht 672	Amsterdam	1672	
2003	84	The Old Mint	Muntpromenade 7	Weert	1580	in the Eighty Years' War Count Horn minted his coins here; since 1974 a café-restaurant
2004	85	Penha gebouw	Heerenstraat 1	Willemstad	1708	issued at the 70th anniversary of the air link between Amsterdam and Curaçao
2005	86	Teylers Museum	Spaarne 16	Haarlem	1780	
2006	87	Het Peperhuis (pepper house)	Wierdijk 12	Enkhuizen	1625	Zuiderzee Museum
2007	88	‘t Lootsje	Rozengracht 99-101	Amsterdam	1892	
2008	89	Secretarishuisje (the secretary's house)	Muurhuizen 109	Amersfoort	1547	
2009	90	Wester-Amstel	Amsteldijk Noord 55	Amstelveen	1662	At the ninetieth birthday KLM issued a jubilee book, House No 90
2010	91	Antillenhuis	Badhuisweg 175	The Hague	1899	presented in Madurodam, together with the unveiling of the replica of the Antillenhuis
2011	92	De Drie Haringen (the three herrings)	Brink 55	Deventer	1575	
2012	93	Siebold house	Rapenburg 19	Leiden	1752	
2013	94	Oudheidkamer (antiquities museum)	Kogerstraat 1	Den Burg, Texel	1591	
2014	95	Heineken Brewery	Stadhouderskade 78	Amsterdam	1913	
2015	96	Hendrick Hamel house	Kortendijk 67	Gorinchem	2009	
2016	97	Hotel New York	Koninginnenhoofd 1	Rotterdam	1901	former headquarter of the Holland America Line; issued at the 70th birthday of the first KLM regular service to New York
2017	98	Parental home of Anthony Fokker	Kleine Houtweg 41	Haarlem	1791	current house number is 65
2018	99	De Witte Os (the white ox)	de Midstraat	Joure	1753	The original Douwe Egberts shop. Part of Museum Joure since 1985.
2019	100	Huis ten Bosch palace (house in the woods)	's-Gravenhaagse Bos 10	The Hague	1645	official residence of the Dutch monarch
2020	101	De Moriaan	Markt 79	Hertogenbosch	1130	Known as the oldest brick building in the Netherlands.
2021	102	Tuschinski Theatre	Reguliersbreestraat 26-34	Amsterdam	1921	In honor of its centenary.
2022	103	Cas Écury		Oranjestad	1929	Centrepiece of the Écury complex
2023	104	Valkenburg railway station	Stationsstraat 10	Valkenburg aan de Geul	1853	
2024	105	House on the three canals	Grimburgwal, Oudezijds Voorburgwal, Achterburgwal	Amsterdam	1610	
2025	106	Villa Rameau	Kloksteeg 16	Leiden	1645	

== See also ==
- KLM (section Delft Blue houses)
- Canals of Amsterdam
