= Netherlands–South Korea relations =

Foreign relations

- Netherlands: South Korea

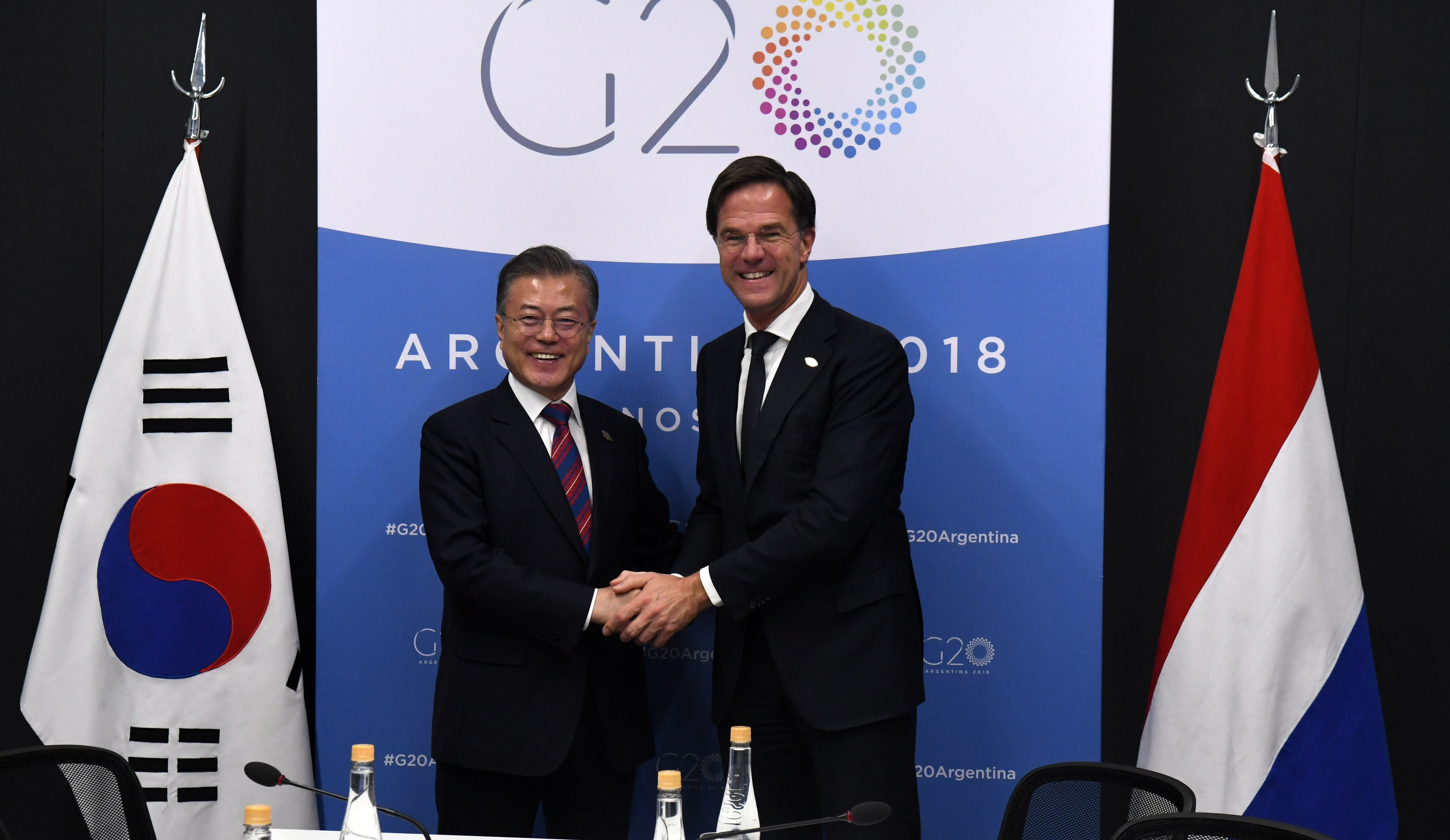
South Korean President Moon Jae-in and Dutch Prime minister Mark Rutte at the 2018 G20 summit in Buenos Aires, 1 December 2018

Netherlands–South Korea relations are foreign relations between South Korea and the Netherlands. The Netherlands have an embassy in Seoul, while South Korea has an embassy in The Hague.

== History ==
=== Pre-20th century ===
Korea was relatively unknown to Westerners, including the Dutch, and compared to neighbouring countries such as China or Japan,

Initially, the Dutch (also called Hwaran (花蘭)) were thought to be part of the Nanman people by the Koreans.

The first Dutchman attested to have made contact with Korea was Jan Jansz Weltevree, who arrived in 1627 ship wrecked with crew and spent the rest of his life in Korea; marrying a local woman.

Later Hendrik Hamel, who unintentionally arrived in 1653, recorded Weltevree and Korea in his journal. Hamel escaped in 1666 and returned to Amsterdam in 1668. Hamel's journals and his descriptions of Korea led, the Dutch East India Company to task a ship (the Corea) with exploring this nation, with expectations of resources and flourishing trade opportunities. This attempt to directly trade with Korea and bypass Japanese middlemen, however, was rejected by Japanese authorities. The Dutch showed interest in Korea regarding its role in producing porcelain, as the Qing had placed an export ban. In 1669, Batavian officials were eager to forge relations with Korea, fearing that the Portuguese in Macau might do so first.

=== 20th century ===
The Netherlands recognized South Korea in 1949 and officially launched diplomatic relations in 1961.

==== Korean War ====
The Dutch participated in the Korean War as part of the United Nations.

== Economy ==
The two countries forged an economic technology cooperation treaty in 1982.

== Economic cooperation ==
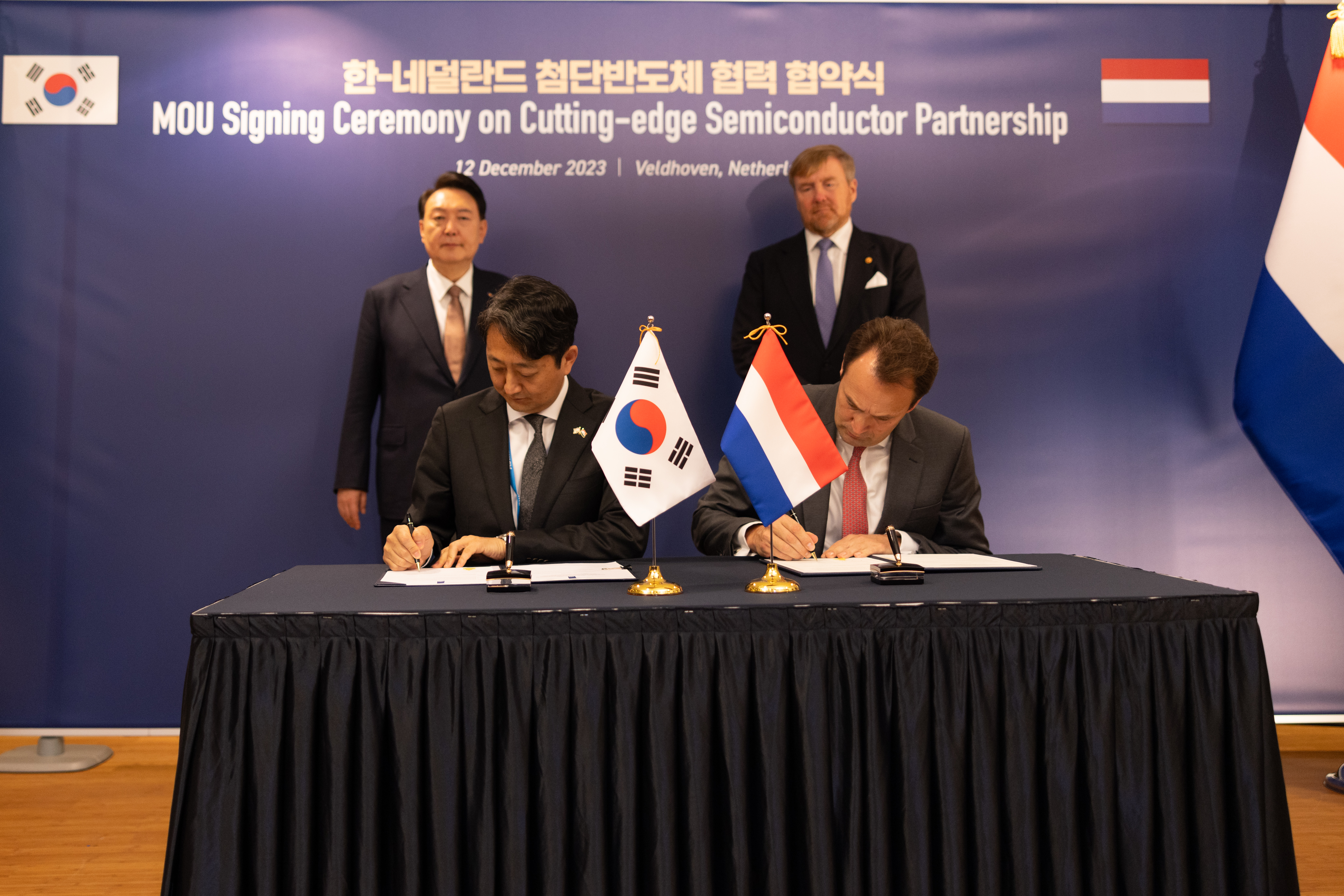
South Korean President Yoon Suk Yeol, alongside Dutch King Willem-Alexander

In December 2023, South Korean President Yoon Suk Yeol visited the headquarters of Dutch semiconductor equipment company ASML and pledged full support for semiconductor cooperation between South Korea and the Netherlands. And on the occasion of Yoon's state visit in 2023, the two countries agreed to establish a strategic partnership and to establish a 2+2 foreign affairs and industry ministerial dialogue every two years to deepen it. In addition, the two countries agreed to promote information sharing on supply chains for key materials and to cooperate in the nuclear energy industry and renewable energy sector.

== Resident diplomatic missions ==
- the Netherlands has an embassy in Seoul.
- South Korea has an embassy in The Hague.

== See also ==
- Foreign relations of the Netherlands
- Foreign relations of South Korea
- Koreans in the Netherlands
