= Moseulpo Port =

Port in Jeju Province, South Korea

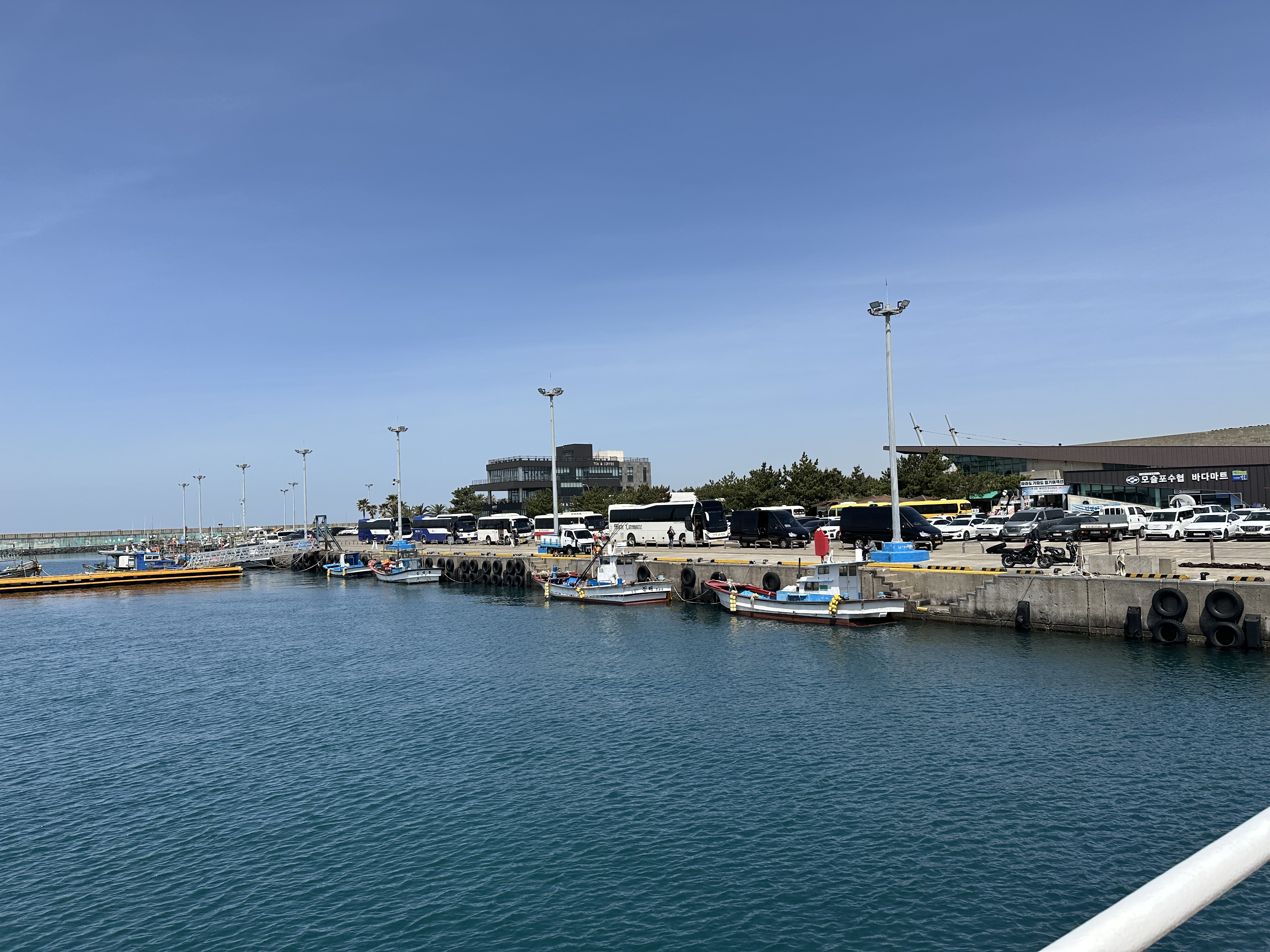
- The port (2026)
- Interactive map of Moseulpo Port

Location
- Country: South Korea
- Location: Seogwipo, Jeju Province
- Coordinates: 33°12′58″N 126°15′02″E

Moseulpo Port (Korean: 모슬포항; Hanja: 摹瑟浦港) is a port in Hamo-ri, Seogwipo, Jeju Province, South Korea.

== Description ==
Its name is derived from the Korean word mosalgae (모살개), meaning "port with sand". The waters around the port have long been reputed as good for fishing, with its Japanese amberjack (방어; bangeo) being particularly famous. Around the immediate vicinity of the port, there are numerous restaurants that specialize in the fish, and a festival themed around the fish is held around late November each year.

In 1918, during the Japanese colonial period, it had a shipping route with Osaka, Japan. In 1971 it was designated a type 1 fishing port, and is now a national fishing port. It now maintains routes to Gapado, an island south of Jeju.

Nearby is Hamo Beach (하모해변), which is sometimes referred to as Moseulpo Beach. Also nearby is the Moseulpo Jungang Market (모슬포중앙시장).
