= Hendrick Hamel =

First Westerner to write on Korea (1630–1692)

- Hendrik Hamel
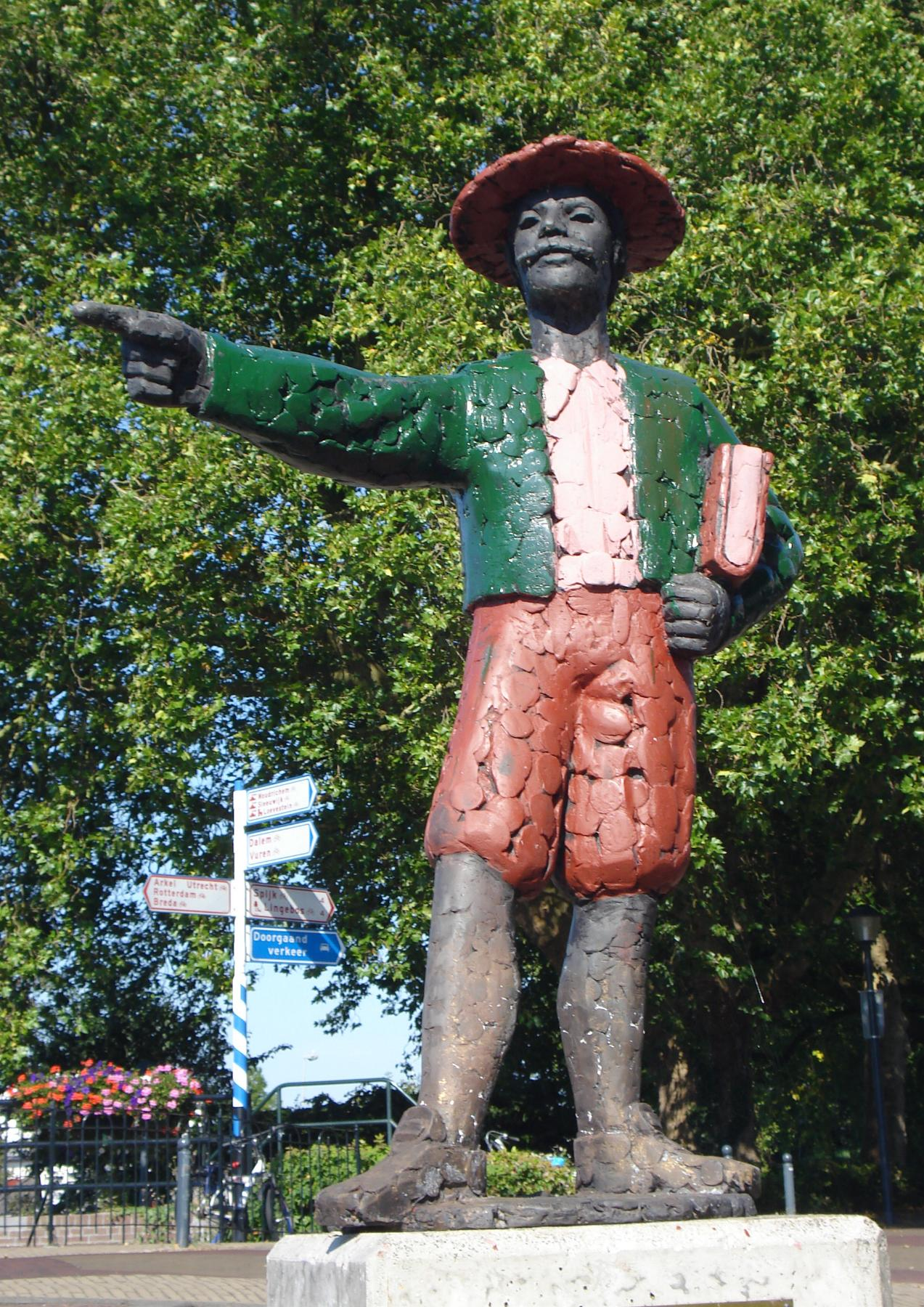
- Posthumous statue of Hamel in Gorinchem, Netherlands
- Born: 1630; Gorinchem, Netherlands
- Died: After 1692 (at least 61–62)
- Occupation: Sailor
- Known for: Writing the earliest Western account of Korea

Hendrick Hamel (1630 – after 1692) (Note: He is last attested to in 1692, but unknown when exactly he died.) was a Dutch sailor. He provided the first Western account of Korea.

Little is known of Hamel's early life and life after his journey to Korea. He was born in the Netherlands in 1630, and sailed to the Dutch East Indies (now Indonesia) in 1650.

In 1653, while sailing to Japan, Hamel and his crew were shipwrecked off Jeju Island, then part of the state of Joseon. Because of Joseon's isolationist policies, they were refused permission to leave the country. Hamel ended up spending thirteen years in Joseon, until he escaped to a Dutch trading mission to Dejima island, Japan in 1666. There, he wrote the earliest first-hand account of a Westerner in Korea, "Hamel's Journal and a Description of the Kingdom of Korea, 1653–1666" which was subsequently published in the Netherlands in 1668.

In recent years, Hamel has become a symbol of cultural and economic exchange between the Netherlands and South Korea. A number of monuments exist to him in both countries.

== Early life and career ==
Hendrick Hamel was born in 1630 in Gorinchem, Netherlands. Little is known of his early life. In 1650, he sailed to the Dutch East Indies where he found work as a bookkeeper with the Dutch East India Company (VOC).

== Korea ==
=== Jeju ===
On 17 August 1653, while sailing to Japan on the ship De Sperwer ('The Sparrowhawk'), Hamel and thirty-five other crewmates survived a deadly shipwreck on the island Gapado, which itself was off the coast of Quelpart, Joseon (now Jeju, South Korea). Four days later, Hamel and his crew were taken to Jeju City. After meeting with the travelers, the local prefect Yi Wonjin sent an announcement to King Hyojong of Joseon that described the situation and requested advice on how to deal with the Dutchmen. In October, the local government brought Jan Janse Weltevree, a Dutchman who himself had become shipwrecked on Korea 27 years prior, to converse with Hamel and his crew. With the help of Weltevree, the Dutchmen formed a positive relationship with Yi Wonjin.

Several months into their stay on Jeju, Yi Wonjin was replaced by a new prefect, who was cruel to Hamel and his crew. Soon after the new prefect replaced Yi Wonjin, he received a response to Yi Wonjin's announcement that had been sent to the Joseon court months earlier. Although the announcement dismissed any chance of the crew's release, it declared that the Korean government had "a moral obligation to ease their existence," It also called for the castaways to be sent to Seoul.

=== Seoul ===
In June 1655, after spending nearly a year on Jeju, Hamel and the others were taken to Hanseong, the capital of Joseon. Once Hamel and his crew arrived, they were taken before king Hyojong. (Note: The location of the meeting is now around the Gwanghwamun area of Seoul.) With the help of Weltevree, they begged the king to release them so they could return home to their wives and children. The king denied their request, citing official policy. The king then asked the Dutchmen to entertain him with song and dance from their home country.

As was the customary treatment of foreigners at the time, the government forbade Hamel and his crew from leaving the country. However, they were given freedom to live within Korean society. During their two years in Seoul, Hamel and his crew served in the king's guard. They lived in a complex administered by Korean landlords and, in addition to their duties in the king's guard, performed domestic chores for their landlords. Outside of these duties, Hamel and his crew were permitted to live relatively normal lives.

In 1656, two of Hamel's crew caused a disturbance when they ambushed a Manchu envoy on its way to Seoul and begged the Manchu officials to help them escape. Because of this, and mounting pressure to dispose of the Dutchmen, in 1657, King Hyojong banished Hamel and his crew to a military garrison in Jeolla Province on the Southwest corner of the peninsula.

=== Jeolla Province ===
Hamel and his crew spent seven years in Jeolla, where they acquired "houses, households and gardens, all nicely set up after the customs of the country." Much of their well-being and comfort depended on the attitude of the commandant in charge. Some commandants were crueler than others, burdening Hamel and his crew with extra duties. At one point, Hamel and his crew resorted to begging, a vocation they actually found rewarding since, as foreigners, they had no trouble drawing a large crowd. At least one of these men founded the Byeongyeong Nam clan.

== Escape to Japan ==
Because of a local famine from 1659 to 1663, Korean officials at the garrison decided to divide the burden of hosting the Dutchmen between three different areas. Of the twenty-two Dutchmen still alive, five went to Suncheon, five went to Namwon, and twelve, including Hamel, went to the headquarters of the Left Provincial Naval District, near modern-day Yeosu.

Situated on the water, Hamel and the group at the naval district quickly recognized they were in an excellent position to escape. Down to eight from the original twelve, the group slowly gathered supplies and negotiated the purchase of a small fishing boat from a local Korean. On 4 September 1666, an especially dark day with good tidal conditions, the men left their compound, loaded their boat, and headed out to sea. Four days later, Japanese boats found Hamel and his crew near the Goto island chain.

Hamel and seven of his crewmates managed to escape to Japan where the Dutch operated a small trade mission on an artificial island in the Nagasaki harbor called Dejima. During the negotiations, per Hamel's request, the Japanese inquired about the remaining crewmen in Korea. Two years later, the Japanese secured their release as well.

During his time in Nagasaki (September 1666 to October 1667) Hamel wrote his account of his time in Korea. From here, Hamel and his crew left to Batavia (modern day Jakarta) in the Dutch East Indies in late 1667. Although his crew continued on to the Netherlands in 1668, Hamel himself stayed in Batavia until 1670 trying, in vain, to secure fourteen years of back salary from the Dutch East India Company. Once his crew returned to the Netherlands, experts believe they had three versions of Hamel's original manuscript published in 1668.

== Later life ==
According to Professor Henny Savenije, it is not known when Hamel returned to the Netherlands. A handwritten document dated to around 1734 states that Hamel settled back in Gorinchem around 1670. He eventually possibly went back to the Indies, and back to the Netherlands by 1690. He was still a bachelor and unmarried by 1692.

== Legacy ==
Hamel's book was translated into French in 1670, German in 1672, and English in 1705. These editions were republished and retranslated several times, especially during the 18th and 19th centuries. While the text contained no examples of hangul, it does contain one of the earliest Western accounts of Koreans using a script other than Chinese.

Hamel's legacy has become a means of cultural and economic exchange between the Netherlands and South Korea, and memorials to him exist in both countries.

=== Memorials in the Netherlands ===
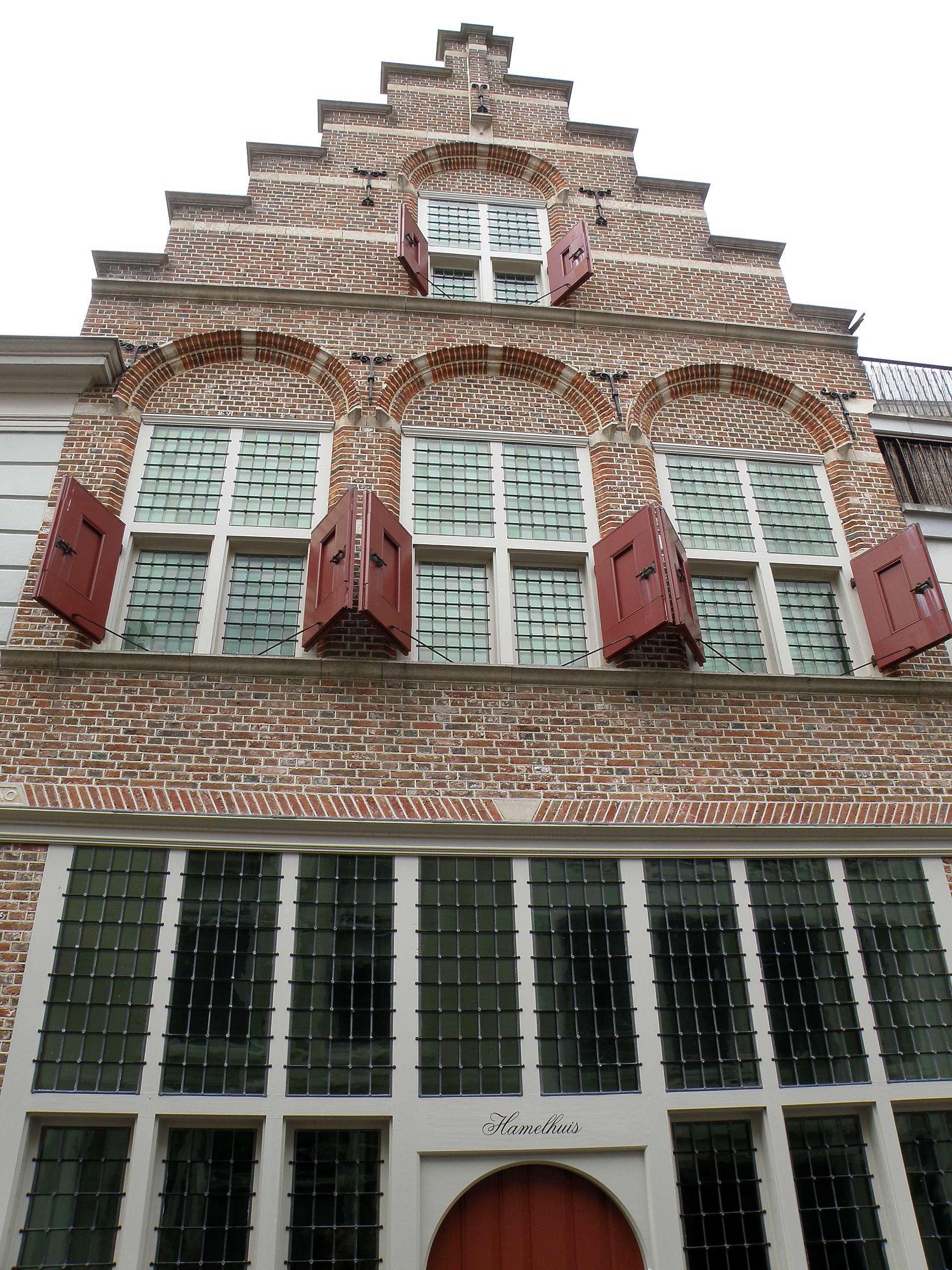
Hamel museum in Gorinchem

On 7 July 1930, a street in the Linge district of Gorinchem was named "Hendrick Hamel Street" (Hendrik Hamelstraat) in his honor. The street still bears his name. In 1981 another "Hendrick Hamel Street" (Hendrick Hamelstraat) and Hendrick Hamel Public Garden (Hendrik Hamelplantsoen were named after the explorer in the Hague. Two similar statues exist of Hamel, one in Gorinchem and another in Gangjin County, South Korea. On 4 June 2015, the Hendrick Hamel Museum opened in Gorinchem. The museum was established via a 2009 agreement between the South Korean Ministry of Foreign Affairs and the Hamel Foundation. A Hamel-themed art exhibition was hosted in Gorinchem in 2016, featuring pieces by Yang Soon-yeal.

=== Memorials in South Korea ===
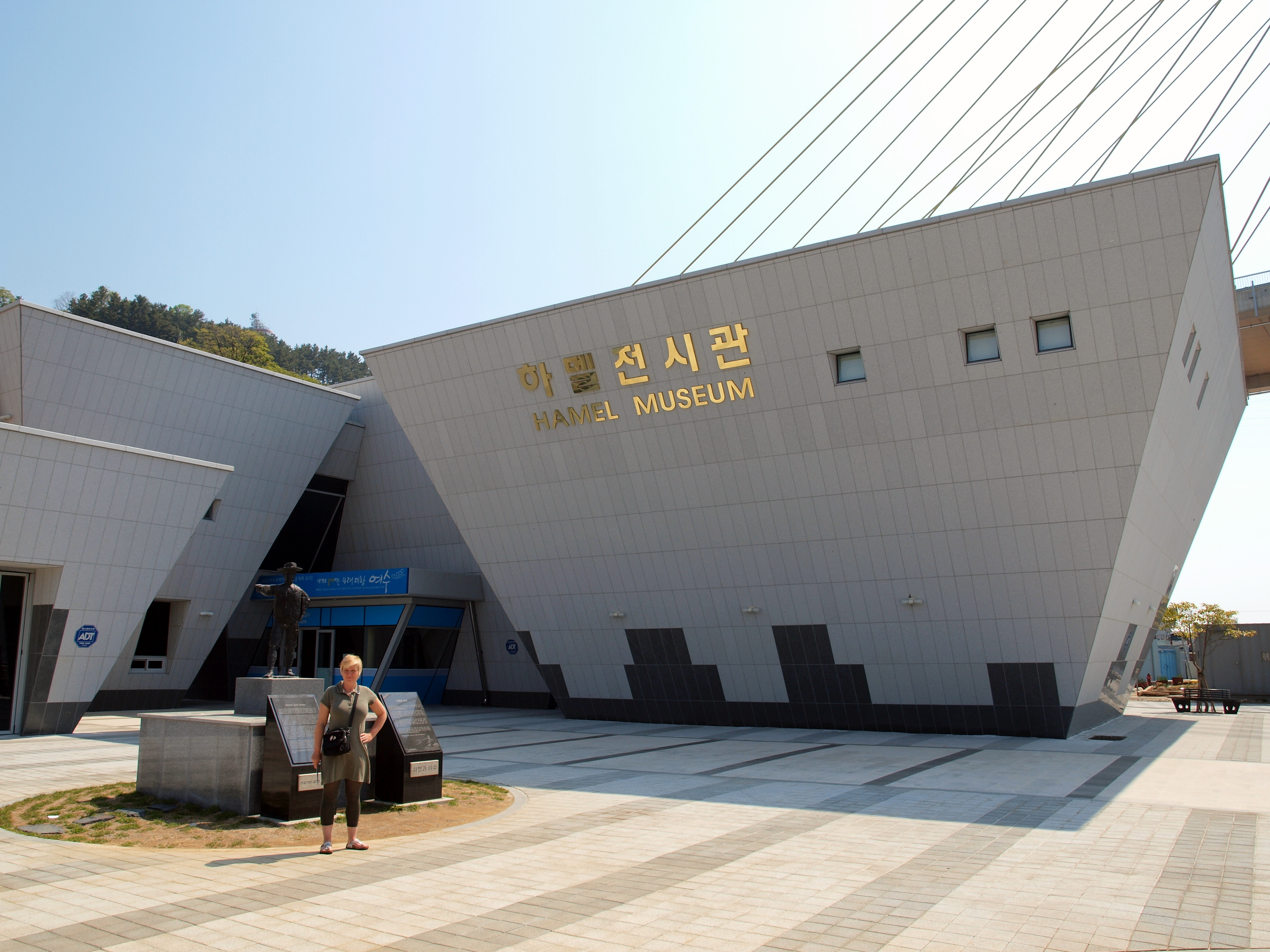
The Hamel Museum in Yeosu, South Korea

There are several museums and monuments to Hamel in South Korea. A museum exists in Gangjin, an exhibition hall shaped like a ship exists on Jeju Island, and a Hamel Museum exists in Yeosu. A 10-meter-tall "Hamel Lighthouse" also stands in Yeosu, South Korea. On 30 December 1997, a gingko tree believed to be mentioned in Hamel's book was designated as a natural monument of South Korea.

In 2012, the Dutch Nationaal Archief donated a copy of Hamel's journal to the Yeosu Hamel Museum.

=== Honors ===
The Association for Korean Studies in Europe offers a Hendrik Hamel Prize for Korean Studies. Since 2003, the Dutch Business Council of Korea has awarded a Hamel Trade Award to Dutch companies that do business in South Korea. On 7 October 2015, the Dutch airline company KLM dedicated a Hamel-themed Delft Blue house to a South Korean businessman.

== In popular culture ==
- The character Hendrik Hamel appears in Jack London's 1915 novel, The Star Rover (released as The Jacket in the United Kingdom); he is a companion of the protagonist during an episode where they are shipwrecked in 17th century Korea.
- The character William in the 2007 manhwa Tamra, the Island and its 2009 South Korean television adaptation is based on Hamel. Parts of the show's story and some of its other characters are also based on parts of Hamel's journal.

== See also ==
- Gregorio Céspedes
- Jan Jansz Weltevree
- Hermit kingdom
- Dutch East Indies
- Dutch Formosa

== Notes and references ==
=== Further reading ===
1. Corea, Without and Within, Hendrick Hamel's narrative of captivity and travels in Corea, annotated, by William Elliot Griffis, Philadelphia: Presbyterian Board of Publication, 1885.
2. Coree-Korea 1653-1666 (Itineraria Asiatica: Korea), Hendrik Hamel, Orchid Press, Thailand, ASIN 9748299481, 1981.
