= Bae Yujin =

South Korean model and actress (born 2002)

- Born: April 30, 2002 (age 23); Greece
- Occupations: Actress, model
- Years active: 2017–present
- Agent: SHS Entertainment

Korean name
- Hangul: 배유진
- Hanja: 裵楢眞
- RR: Bae Yujin
- MR: Pae Yujin

Bae Yujin (Korean: 배유진; April 30, 2002) is a South Korean model and actress of mixed Nigerian and Korean descent.

== Early life and career ==
Bae Yujin was born on April 30, 2002, in Greece to a Korean mother and Nigerian father, and moved to Seoul shortly after. Bae grew up in the Itaewon ward of Seoul, reportedly becoming close with Han Hyun-min — another multiracial South Korean individual.

According to Bae, she had always had an interest in fashion and hoped to be a model. Shortly after her childhood friend Han Hyun-min garnered fame and success as South Korea's first model of Nigerian descent, Bae began her career, garnering attention as the "female Han Hyun-min".

== See also ==
- Multiracial people in South Korea
- Afro-Asians
