= Jan Jansz Weltevree =

Dutch sailor (born 1595)

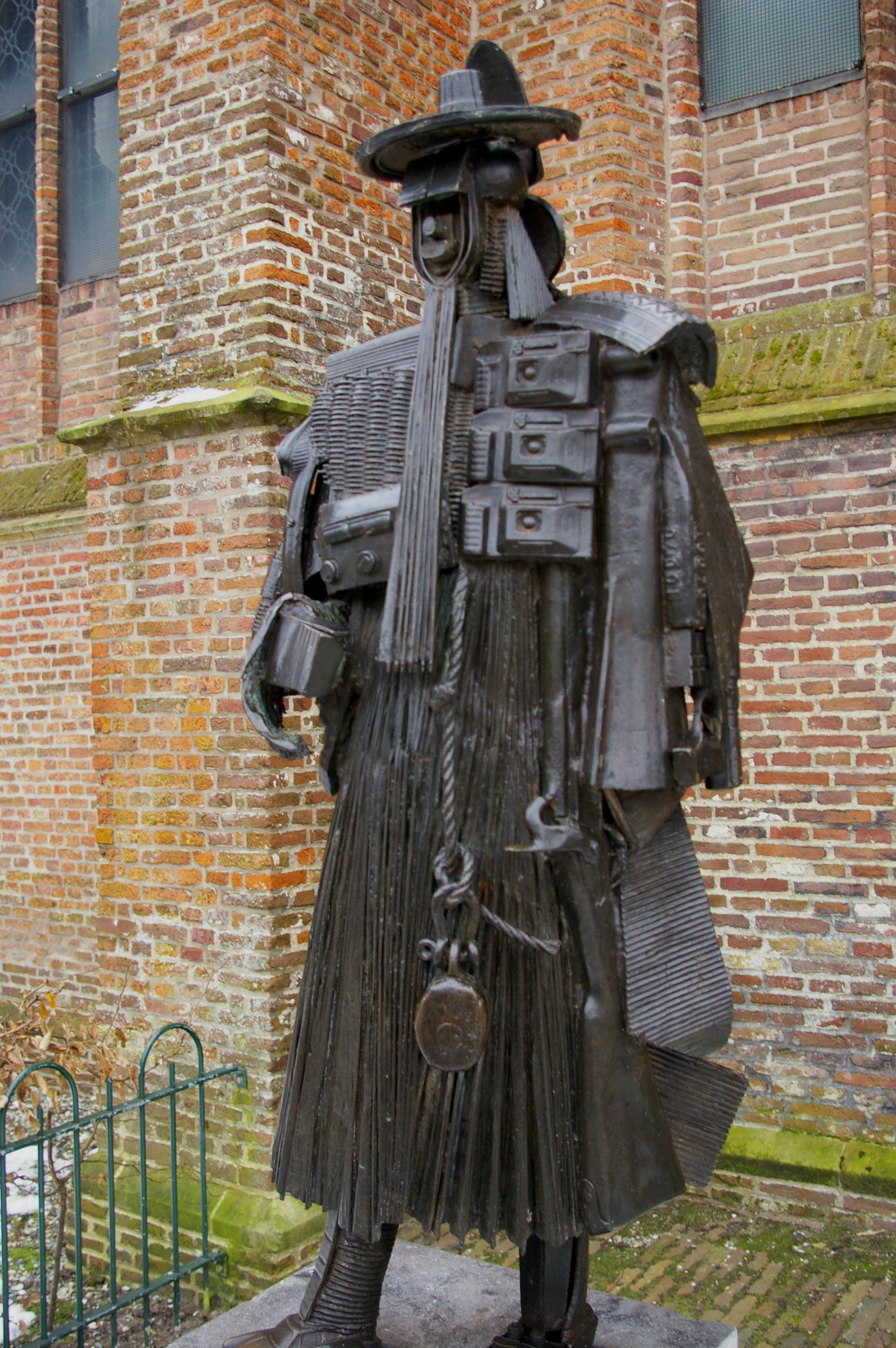

Korean name
- Hangul: 박연
- Hanja: 朴淵; 朴燕
- RR: Bak Yeon
- MR: Pak Yŏn

Jan Janse de Weltevree (born 1595), also known by his Korean name Pak Yŏn (Korean: 박연), was a Dutch sailor and likely the first Dutch visitor to Korea. His adventures were recorded in the report by Dutch East India Company accountant Hendrik Hamel. Hamel stayed in Korea from 1653 to 1666.

== Biography ==
Jan Janse de Weltevree was born around 1595, according to Hendrik Hamel in De Rijp, though other sources speak of Vlaardingen. He signed on the ship Hollandia and went on 17 March 1626 to the Dutch East Indies. He arrived in 1627 from Batavia, Dutch East Indies on the ship Ouwerkerck. On 16 July 1627 the Ouwerkerck with its captain Jan Janse de Weltevree captured a Chinese junk and its 150-man crew bound for the port of Amoy, China. Seventy Chinese were brought aboard the Ouwerkerck. Jan Janse de Weltevree, Dirk Gijsbertsz from De Rijp, and Jan Pieterse Verbaest from Amsterdam, all from Holland, along with thirteen other Dutch crewmen went aboard the junk to sail the vessel to Tainan, Formosa. The Ouwerkerck reached safe harbor after battling a fierce summer storm that swept the area.

The storm-tossed Chinese junk carrying the hapless Dutch and Chinese ended up on the shores of an island off Korea's west coast, during the reign of the Joseon dynasty. Although the details of what happened next are unclear, the Chinese, with a five-to-one advantage, overpowered the Dutch survivors, captured Jan Janse de Weltevree, Dirk Gijsbertsz and Jan Verbaest, and handed them over to the Korean Joseon authorities.

After being captured, the three Dutch survivors were sent to Seoul and were ordered to produce artillery weapons as part of the Capital Defense force. During the Qing invasion of Joseon in 1636, Gijsbertsz was killed in action. Even after the war, Weltevree stayed as a member of Capital Defense force and served as a commander of division consisting of former Japanese or Chinese prisoners of war. He soon naturalized to Joseon and took the Korean name Pak Yŏn. He married a Korean woman with whom he had two children. Moreover, in 1648, Weltevree passed the civil service examination and became a proper Korean official.

According to Jan Janse de Weltevree, the two other captives from the Ouwerkerck were killed in 1636 during a raid of the Manchu. They would have fought in the Korean army.

In 1653, the ship De Sperwer was wrecked en route from Jakarta to Nagasaki, with Hendrick Hamel on board, and Jan Janse de Weltevree acted as a translator and adviser. This group of 36 Dutchmen stayed in Korea for 13 years, working as military advisors to the Joseon Army, until 8 of them escaped to Nagasaki in 1666. Hendrick Hamel authored the accounts of his stay in Korea, from which we hear about Jan Janse de Weltevree.

== Legacy ==
Beside the Great Church in De Rijp is a statue of Jan Jansz. A replica of this was erected in 1991 in the South Korean capital, Seoul.

== See also ==
- Hendrick Hamel
- Dutch East India Company
- Hermit kingdom
- Dutch East Indies
- Dutch Formosa
- Dejima
