= Gapado =

Island south of Jeju, South Korea

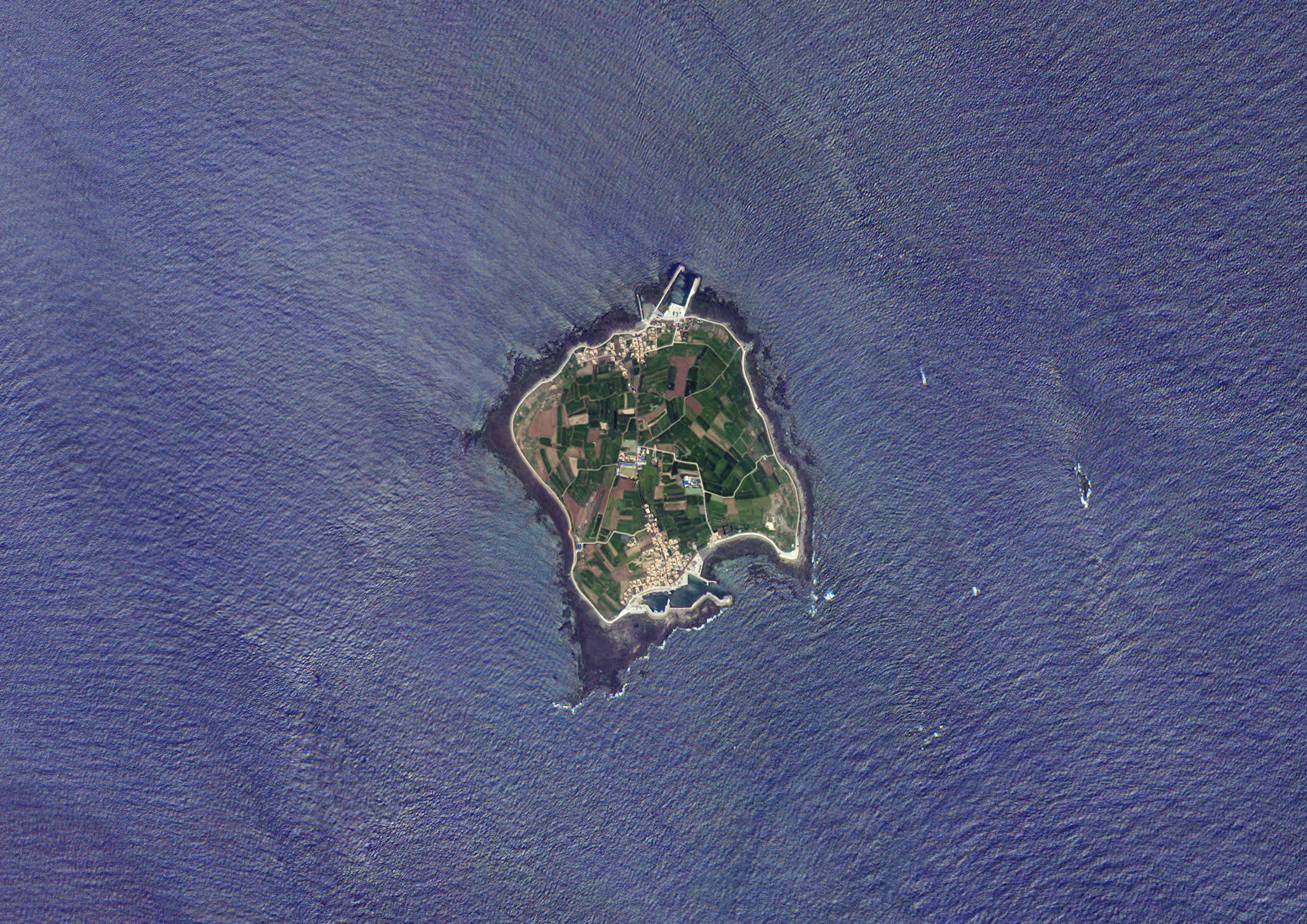
- Satellite image (2015)
- Interactive map of Gapado

Geography
- Coordinates: 33°10′10″N 126°16′18″E
- Area: 0.84 km^{2} (0.32 sq mi)
- Coastline: 4.2 km (2.61 mi)

Administration
- South Korea
- Province: Jeju
- City: Seogwipo
- Town: Daejeong-eup

Additional information
- Official website: wonderfulis.co.kr/island_island/gapado/ (in Korea)

Korean name
- Hangul: 가파도
- Hanja: 加波島
- RR: Gapado
- MR: Kap'ado

Gapado (Korean: 가파도) is a small island 2.2 kilometers (1.4 mi) south of Jeju Island in South Korea. It is Jeju's fourth largest island. It is administered under Daejeong-eup, Seogwipo, Jeju Province. It has an area of 0.84 km^{2} (0.32 mi^{2}) and a coastline length of 4.2 km (2.6 mi). It first became regularly inhabited by humans in 1842. Haenyeo, female divers of Jeju, go diving off the island's coasts.

A ferry runs between the island and Moseulpo Port on Jeju twice daily.

The island is the location where the Dutch mariner Hendrick Hamel first became stranded in Korea in the 17th century. The island has a monument to Hamel.

== Gallery ==
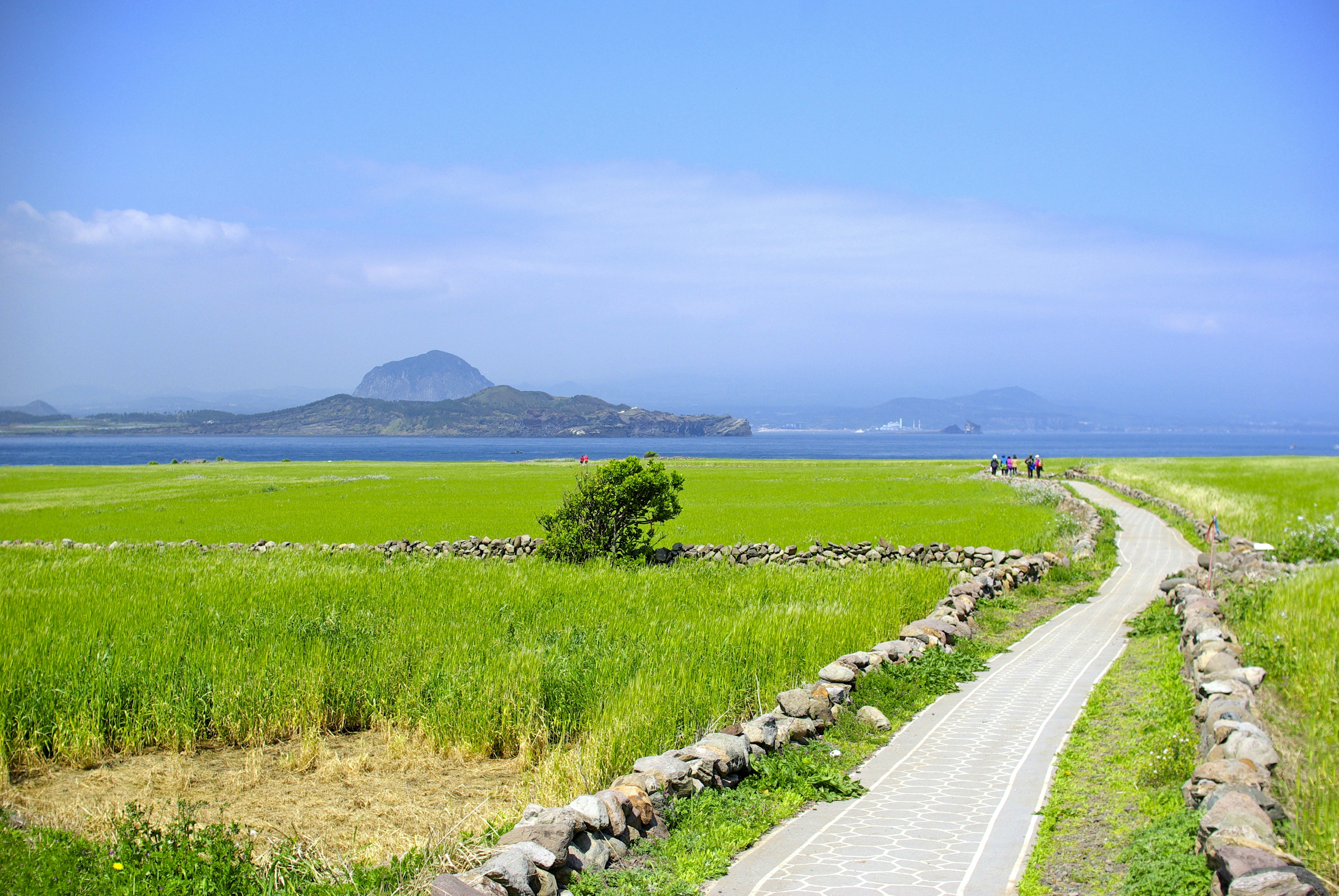
Scenery on the island (2012)

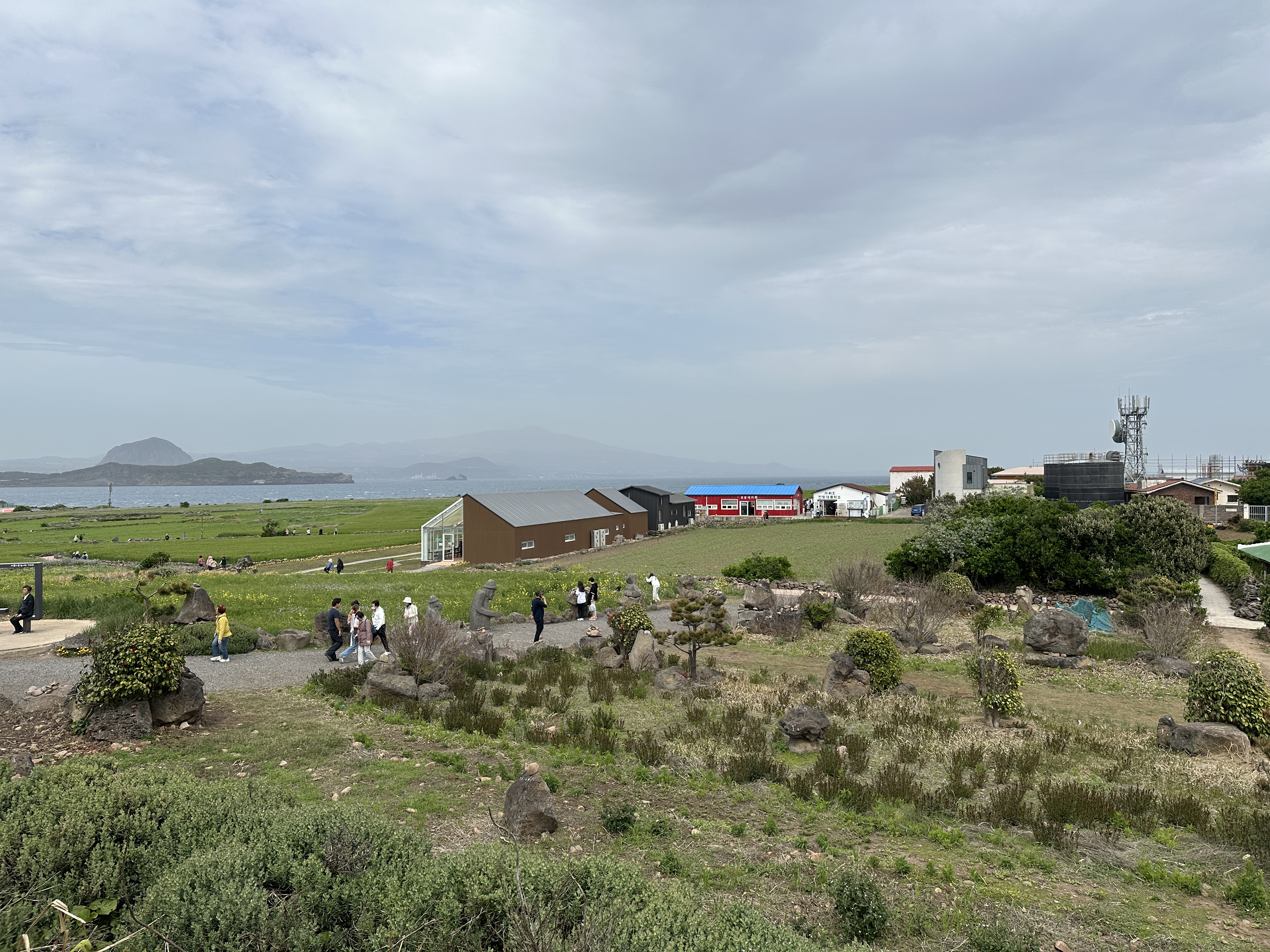
View from center of the island, southeast (2026)

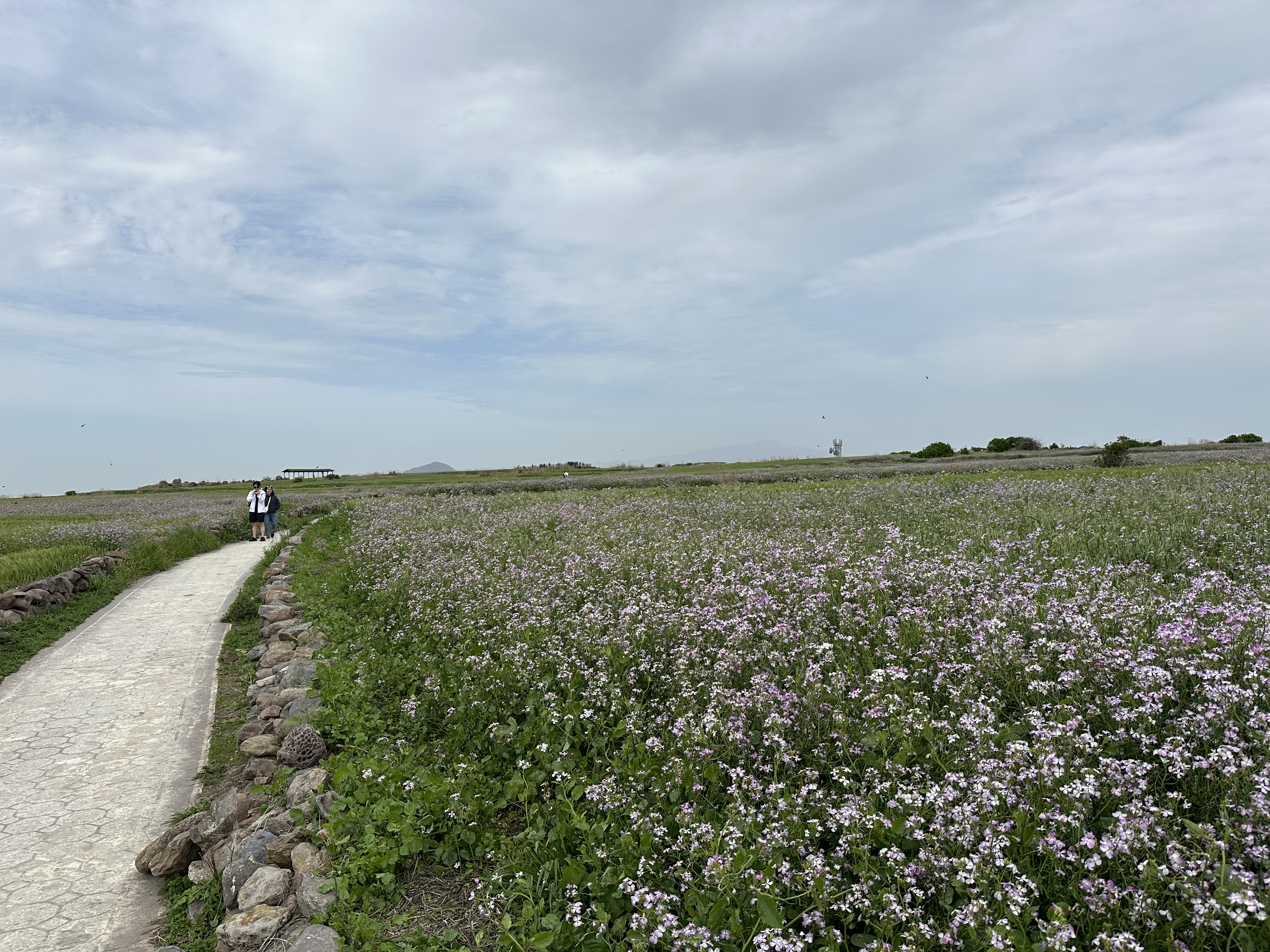
Flowering green barley on the island (2026)

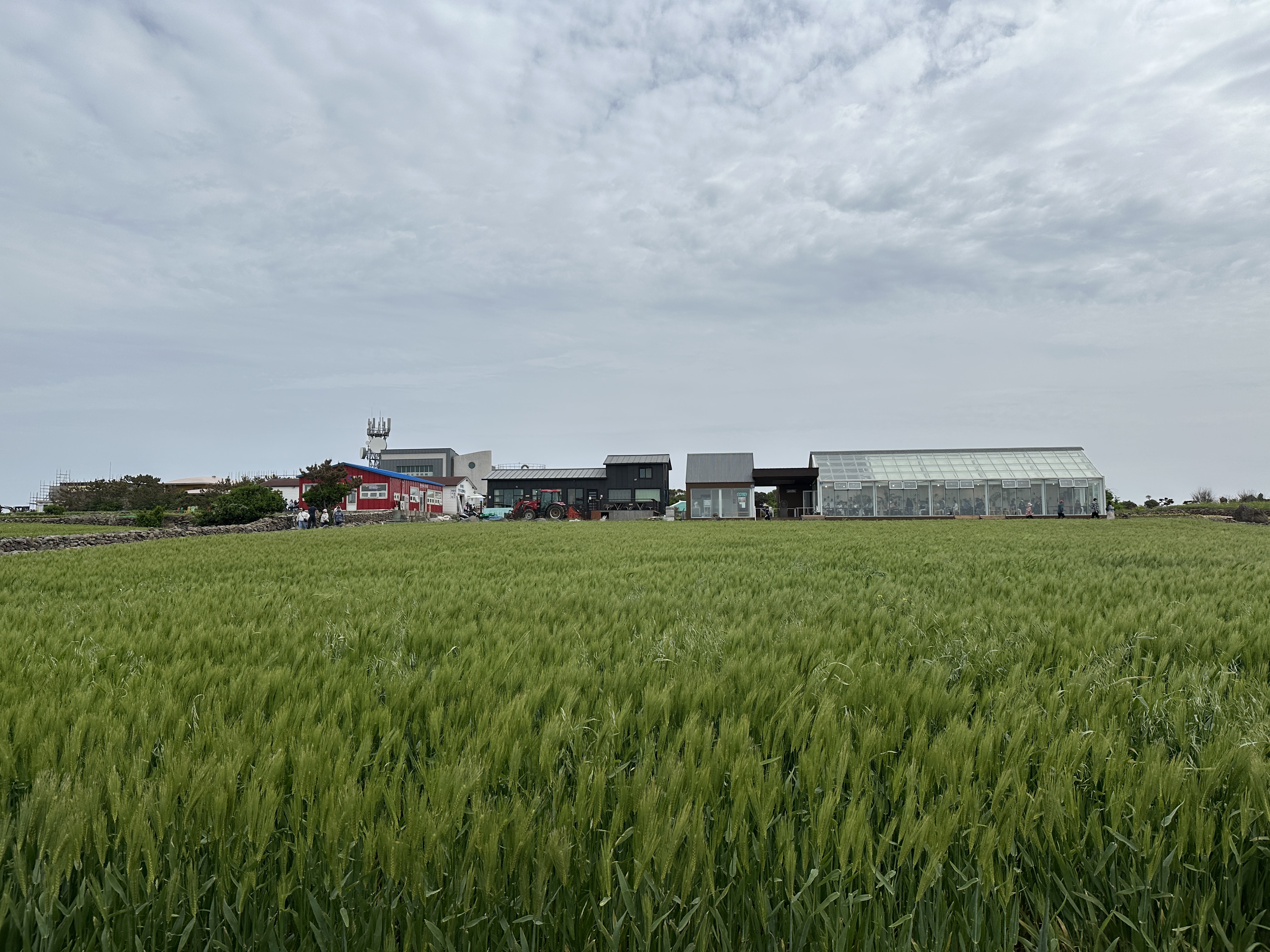
Cafes and stores for tourists (2026)

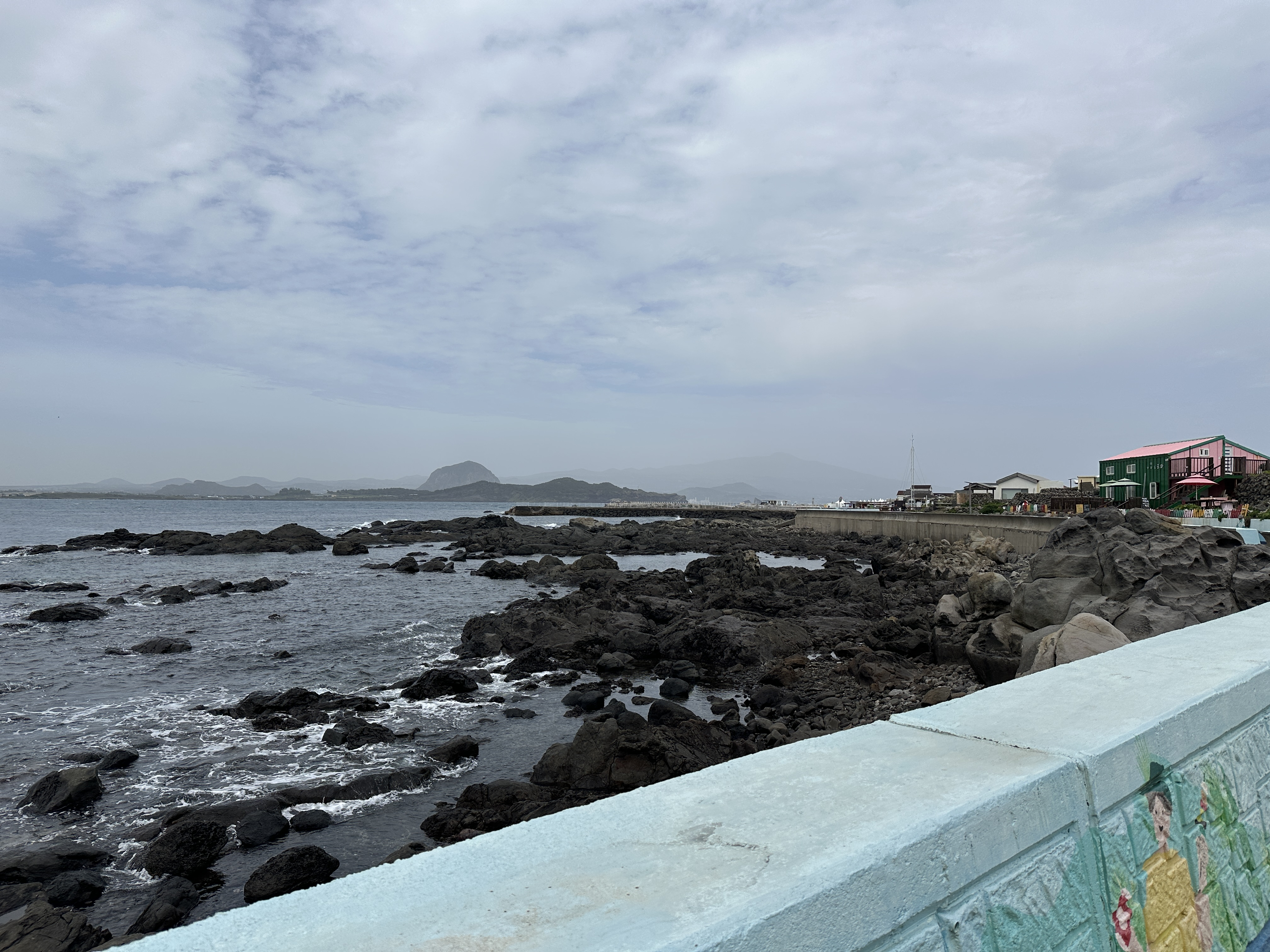
The coast (2026)

== See also ==
- Marado – another island off the south coast of Jeju
