= Yang Soon-yeal =

South Korean artist (born 1959)

Yang SoonYeal
- Born: November 26, 1959; Uiseong County, South Korea
- Education: Catholic University of Daegu
- Known for: New media art
- Notable work: Ottogi

- Yang Soon-yeal
- Hangul: 양순열
- Hanja: 梁順烈
- RR: Yang Sunyeol
- MR: Yang Sunyŏl

Yang SoonYeal (Korean: 양순열, born November 26, 1959) is a South Korean artist who works in multiple media, including painting and sculpture.

== Biography ==
Yang SoonYeal was born in Uiseong County, South Korea in 1959. She received both a bachelor's and master's degree in Oriental painting from Hyosung Women's University (Catholic University of Daegu). From 1996 to 2006, she taught oriental painting as an adjunct professor. Starting with Beokah Museum (Daegu), she held her solo exhibition in the US, Netherland, Japan, and many other institutions and museums. In 2021, the exhibition, 'Motherly Space' held at Gyeongbuk Provincial Government building. She awarded from 55 Contemporary Artist Awards (Seoul Art Center, 2010), and Best Art Award from the 40th Korean Council of Art Critics (2020).

== Exhibitions (selection) ==
- 2026 《We Are The Land - Forbidden Fruits》, JENNIFER BAAHNG Gallery, New York, USA
- 2026 《Warmth in bloom》, Grand Josun, Jeju, South Korea
- 2025 《Ottogi Motherlove》, HONORSTONE, Yongin, South Korea
- 2025 《Jeong》, Hôtel de Rougemont and Spa, Pays d'Enhaut, Switzerland
- 2023 《Ottogi, Rainbow Has Come - Sea of Love》, Gallery INSA 1010, Seoul, South Korea
- 2022 《Mother, the Force That Raises Motherly Ottogi》, Hakgojae Gallery, Seoul, South Korea
- 2022 《玄玄 Epiphany》, The National Assembly of the Republic of Korea, Seoul, South Korea
- 2021 《玄玄 Epiphany》, INDIPRESS, Seoul, South Korea
- 2019 《本 Rhapsody in Hypostasis》, Zaha Museum, Seoul, South Korea
- 2019 《Anima/Animus Ottogi》, Elga Wimmer PCC, New York
- 2018 《Rhapsody in Red》, Elga Wimmer PCC, New York
- 2017 《Yang's Women – Without My Arms to Understand》, Kunstuitleen Alkmaar, Amsterdam, Netherlands
- 2016 《I Long for My Home, Hamelhuis, Gorinchem》, Netherlands
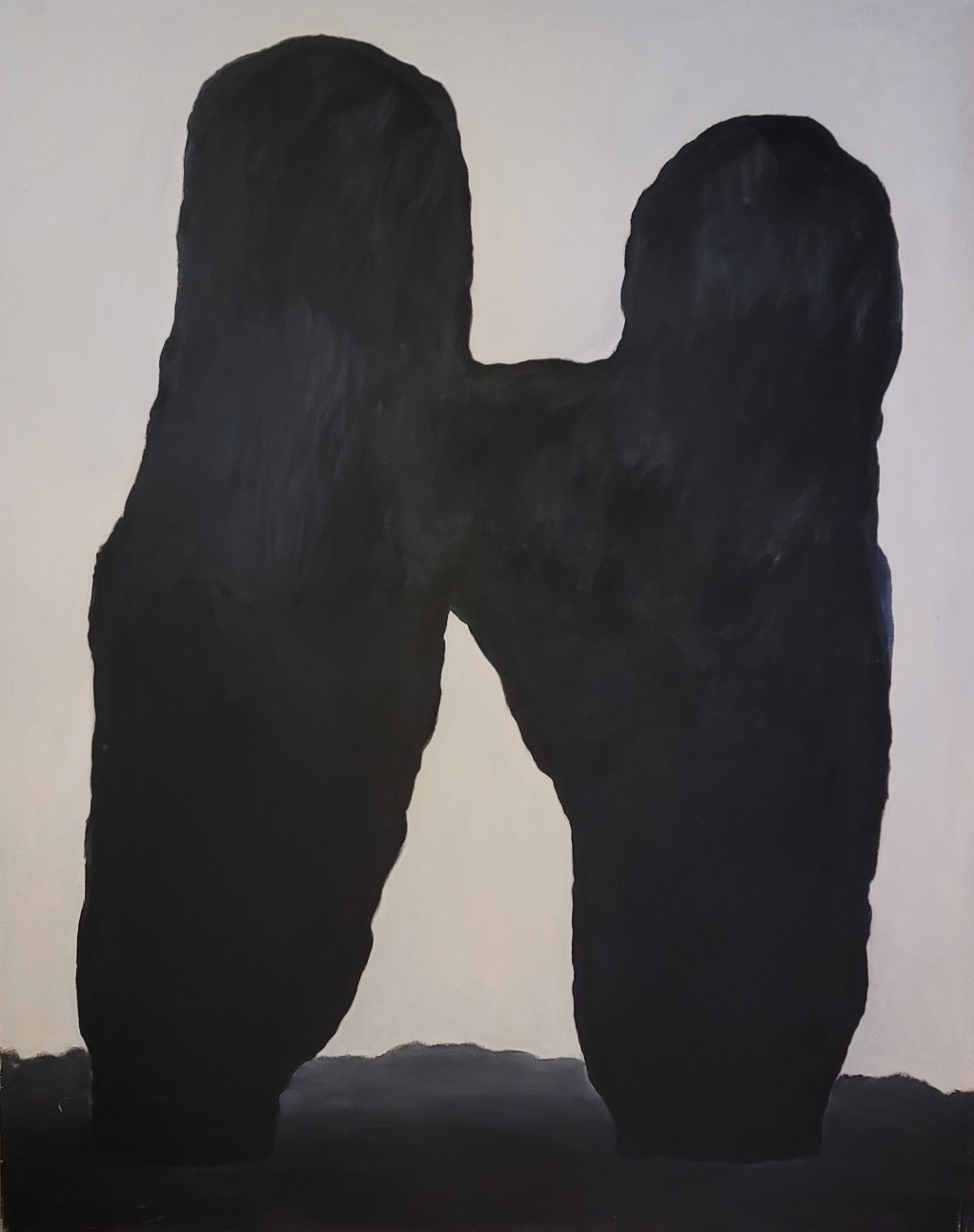
Homo Sapiens 10, 162 x 130cm, Oil on canvas, 2004

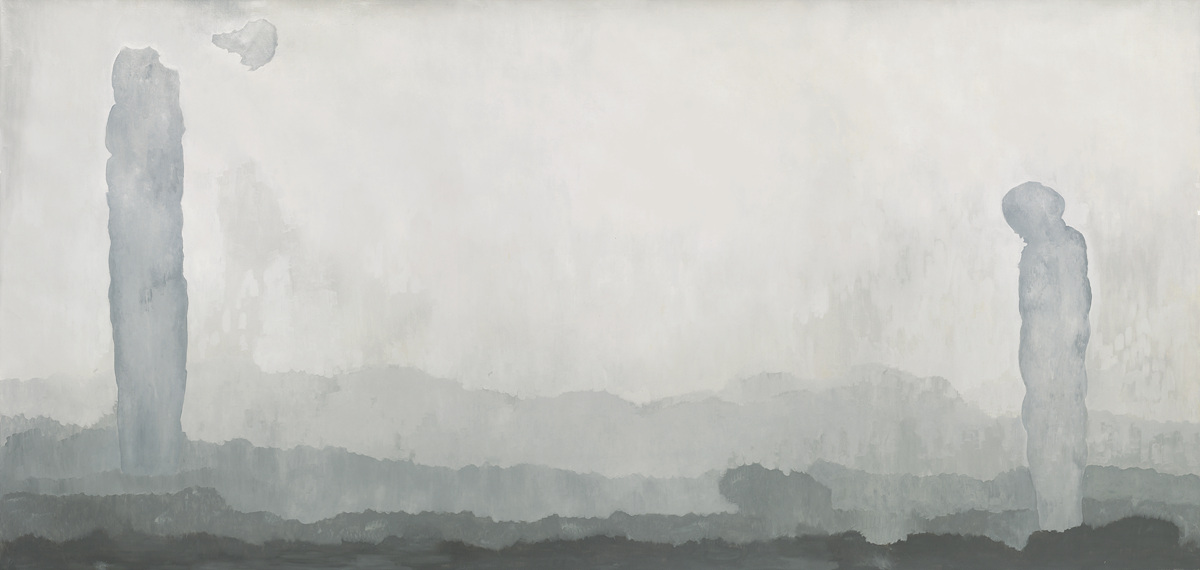
Homo Sapiens – The Adoration, 214 x 446cm, Oil on canvas, 2006

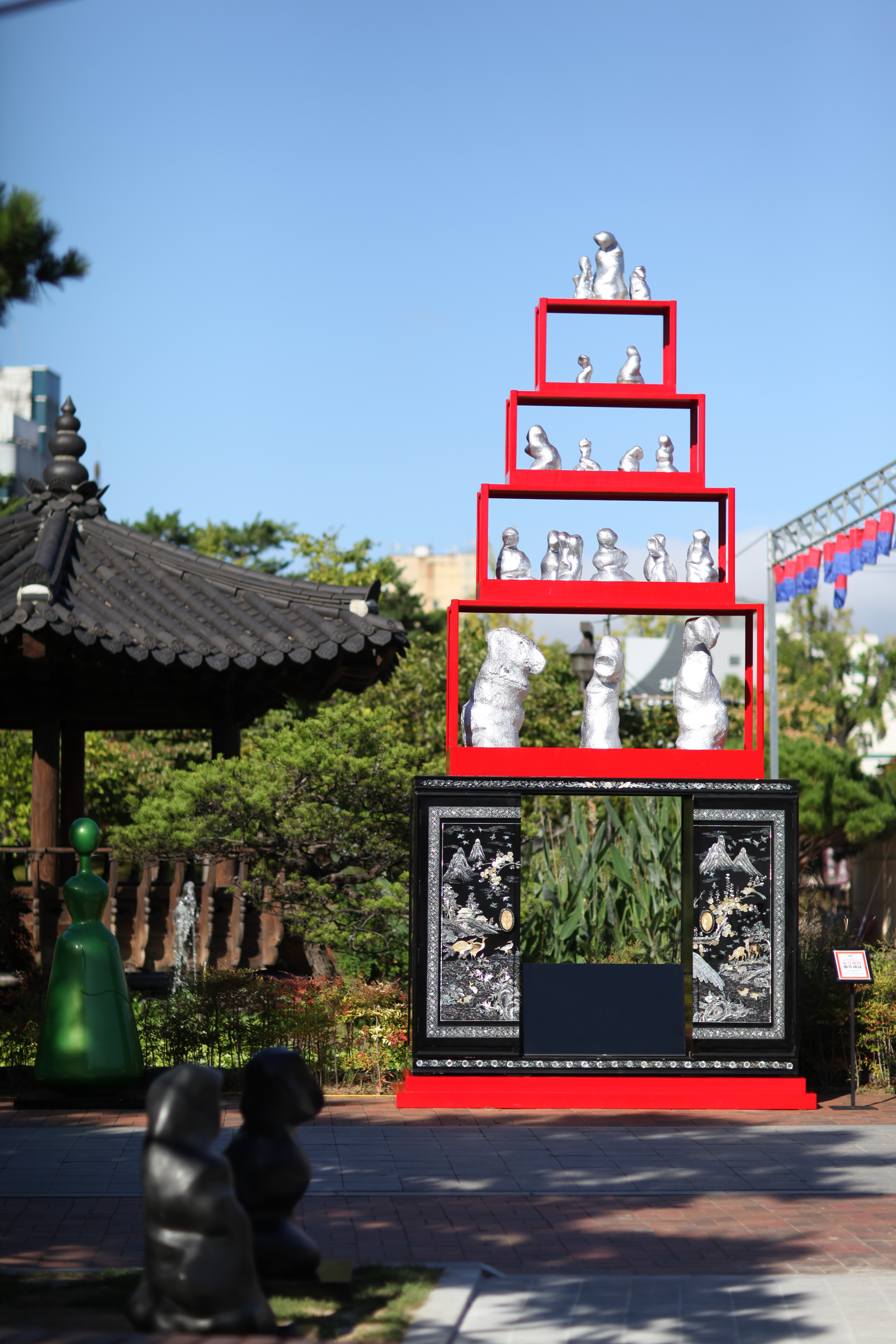
Homo Sapiens Installation, 280 x 168 x 600cm, Video, Korean traditional mother-of-pearl furniture, wood, form, car paint

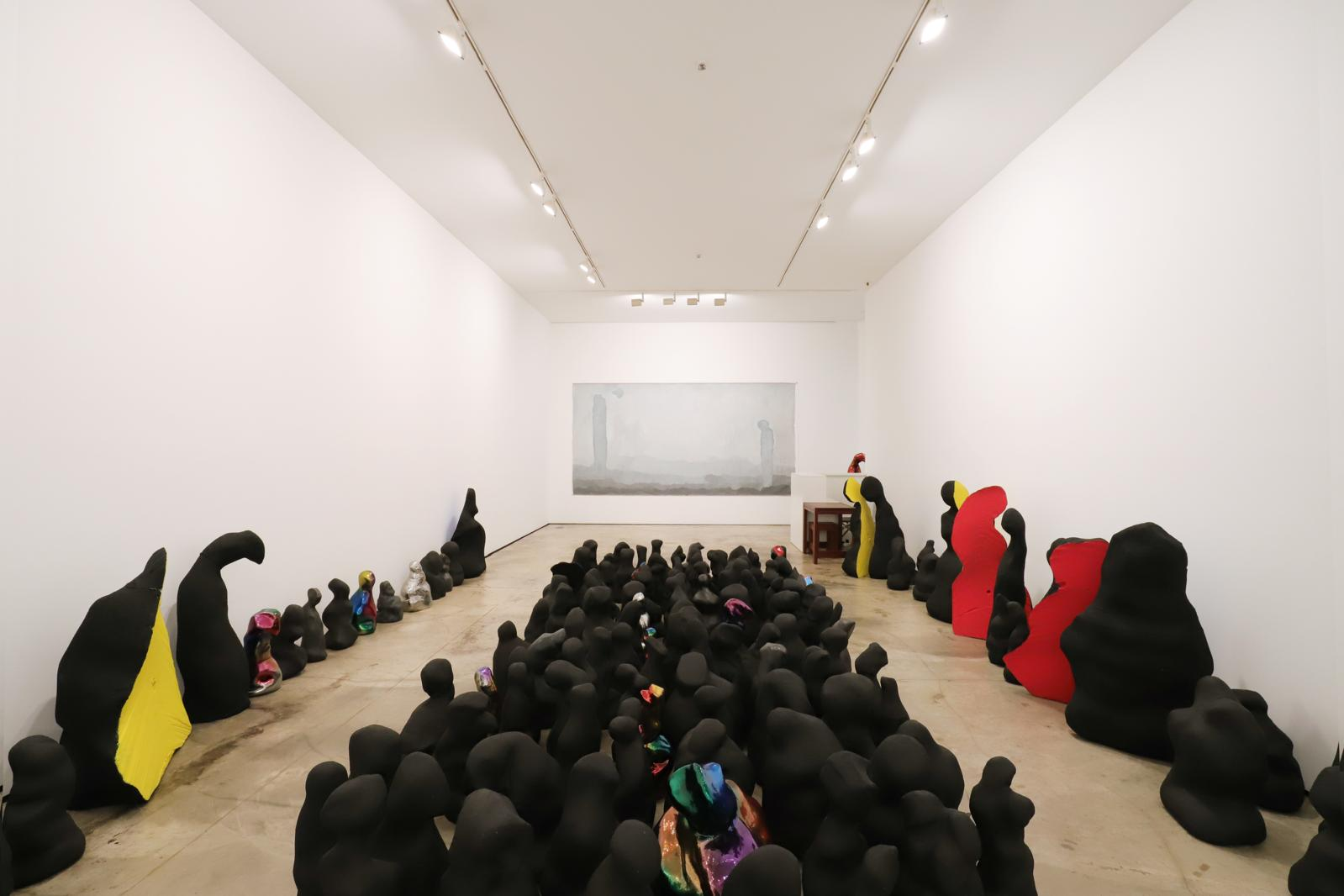
Installation View of ‘Mother, The Force That Raises Motherly Ottogi’ Exhibition, Hakgojae Gallery, Aug. 26 – Sep. 25, 2022

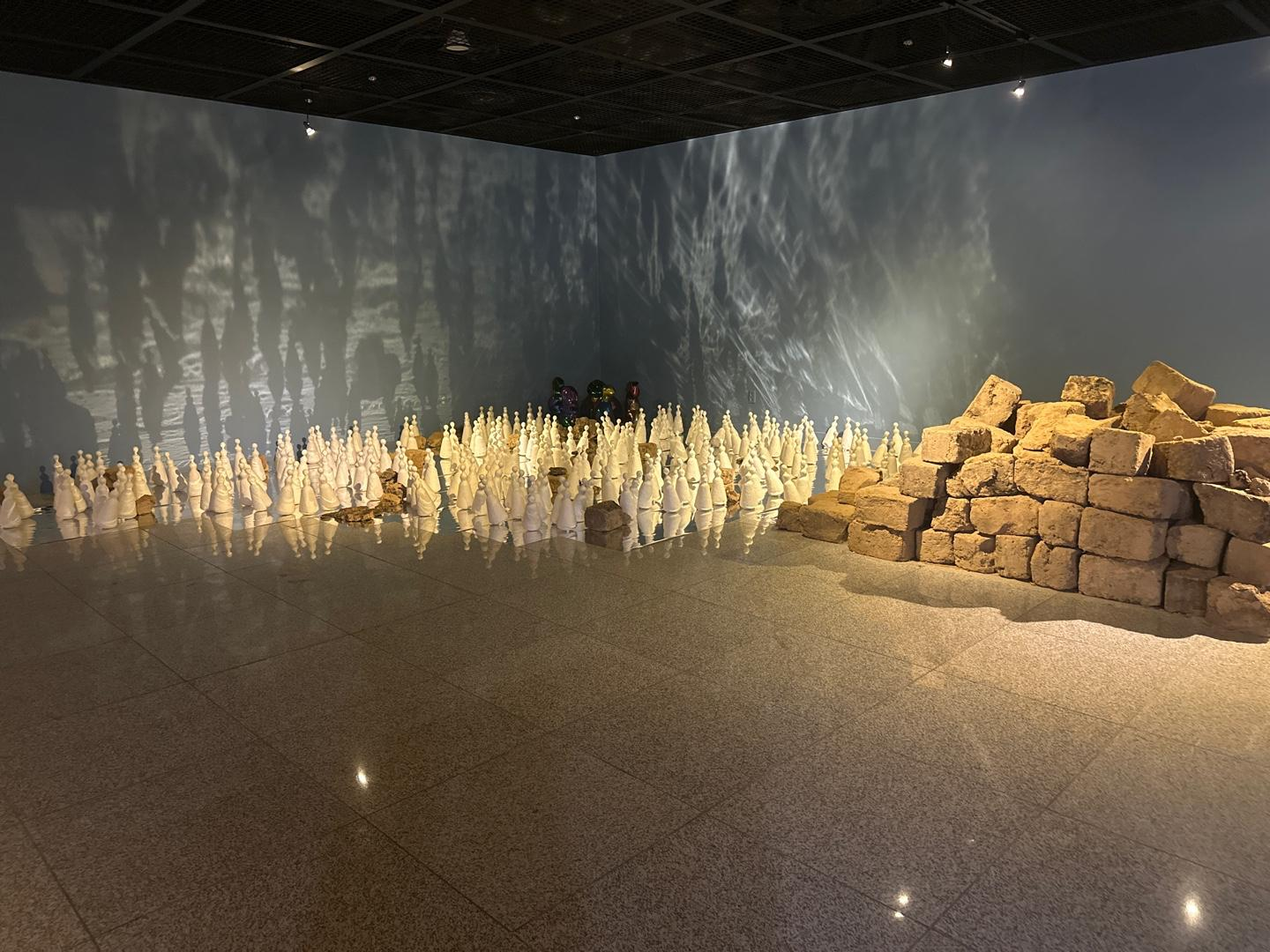
Installation, mud bricks, 280 pieces of Ottogi in Korean paper (28cm (h)). Exhibition View of ‘Motherhood 母性’, Sookmyung Women’s University Moonshin Art Museum, Seoul, 2023

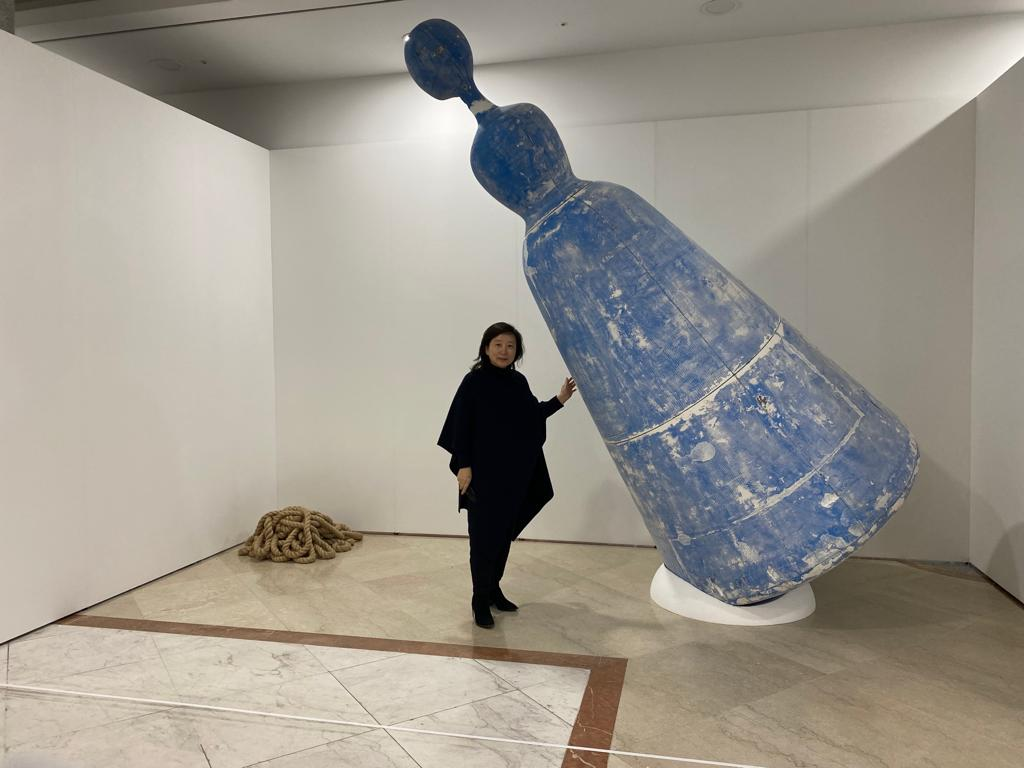
Ottogi, 360cm(h), car paint on resin form. Installation view of ‘Epiphany’ at the National Assembly Member’s Building, Seoul, 2022

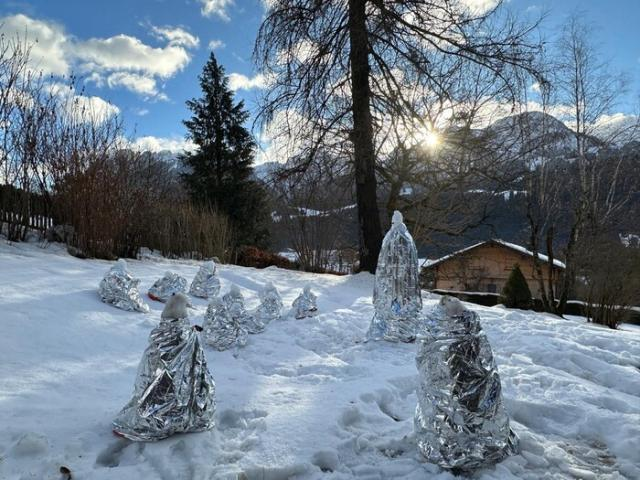
Breath of Nature, Path of Humanity 1, Performance, snow, silver foils for rescue, Château-d’Oex, Switzerland
