= Byeongyeong Nam clan =

Korean clan descended from Dutch mariners

- Country: Korea

Byeongyeong Nam clan (Korean: 병영 남씨; Hanja: 兵營 南氏) was one of the Korean clans. During Joseon period, the ship of Hendrick Hamel’s group had an accident and was adrift in Jeolla Province. After that, a member of Hendrick Hamel's group married a Korean woman, and his descendants are the Byeongyeong Nam clan.

== See also ==
- Korean clan names of foreign origin
