= Koreans in the Netherlands =

Ethnic group

Koreans in the Netherlands Koreanen in Nederland 재네덜란드 한국인
Total population
- 9,469 (2022)

Regions with significant populations
- Amsterdam, Rotterdam

Languages
- Dutch; Korean

Religion
- Christianity and Mahayana Buddhism

Related ethnic groups
- Korean diaspora

Koreans in the Netherlands (Dutch: Koreanen in Nederland; Korean: 재네덜란드 한국인) form one of the smaller Korean diaspora groups in Europe. As of 2022, 9,469 people of Korean origin (expatriates and immigrants from North or South Korea and 2nd-generation Koreans) lived in the Netherlands.

== Demographic characteristics ==
As of 2017, statistics of the Dutch Centraal Bureau voor de Statistiek showed:

- 15 North Korean-born and 3,733 South Korean-born persons
- 12 persons of North Korean origin and 577 persons of South Korean origin born locally to two parents from outside the Netherlands
- 3 persons of North Korean origins and 3,156 persons born locally to one South Korean-born parent and one parent born in the Netherlands

For a total of 8,142 persons, not including ethnic Koreans from other countries. This represented more than five and a half times the 1996 total of 1,492 persons, and growth of between 4% and 8% over the previous five years; the overwhelming proportion of the growth is attributable to increase in the foreign-born population rather than births in the Netherlands. However, Koreans still formed little more than a minute proportion (0.1%) of the total number of persons of foreign background.

2011 statistics of South Korea's Ministry of Foreign Affairs and Trade show a much smaller total of 1,771 persons, little changed from the 2009 total. Among those recorded, 108 were Dutch citizens, 614 were permanent residents, 253 were international students, and the remaining 796 had other types of visas. 629 lived in Amsterdam or its surroundings, 521 in Rotterdam, and the remaining 621 in other parts of the country, but mainly in other larger urban areas such as The Hague, Utrecht, Eindhoven, etc.

== Adoptees ==
About 4,000 of the people of Korean origin in the Netherlands consist of Korean adoptees. Dutch interest in adoption of babies from Asia began with Korean adoption in the late 1960s; Dutch writer Jan de Hartog, who himself had earlier adopted two Korean War orphans, was promoting charitable activities for children in Vietnam who had been orphaned due to the Vietnam War bombings of Hanoi and Haiphong in 1966. In 1968, he appeared on the television show hosted by Mies Bouwman with his two adopted Korean daughters; after this broadcast, nearly a thousand people called the studio and expressed interest in adopting Korean babies. Between 1969 and 2003, Dutch parents adopted 4,147 South Korean babies. The number of adoptions has fallen off; from 1995 to 2006, the total number of adoptions from South Korea was 349, with just two in 2005 and only one in 2006. This made South Korean adoptees about 10.9% of the 3,194 international adoptions and 2.25% of the 15,467 total adoptions during that period.

A small number of adoptees have relocated to South Korea; however, due to cultural differences and the high expectations placed on their behaviour due to their external appearance of being Korean, they find it difficult to fit in there, and also find themselves the objects of unwanted pity for their status as adoptees.

== Education ==
During the 2008–09 academic year, 283 South Korean international students were enrolled in Dutch higher educational institutions, only a small proportion of the 216,780 total South Koreans studying overseas that year. The number showed a slow but steady increase from just 56 students in 2000–01, before plateauing around 2005–06. The Netherlands Organization for International Cooperation in Higher Education also reported receiving many enquiries from South Korean parents interested in enrolling their children in primary and secondary education in the Netherlands. South Korean universities such as Yonsei University and Sungkyunkwan University have signed memoranda of understanding with Dutch universities; however, these have not led to active student exchange programmes. Though Europe in general is becoming an increasingly popular destination for South Korean students, growth in their numbers in the Netherlands is inhibited by the perception that knowledge of the Dutch language is a prerequisite to studying in the country, along with the attractiveness of competitor destinations such as the United Kingdom, France, and Germany. In 2012, Nuffic (the Netherlands Organisation for International Cooperation in Higher Education) estimated that 650 South Korean students were enrolled at Dutch Universities. Nuffic, various Dutch universities, and Heineken cooperated to offer scholarships totalling €255,000 to 21 South Korean students that year.

There are two Korean weekend schools in the Netherlands registered with South Korea's National Institute for International Education Development. The first of the two, the Amsterdam Korean School, was established in May 1979; as of 2004, it employed 14 teachers and enrolled 90 students, including eight adult students. The other, the Korean School of Rotterdam, was established in April 1996; it employed 14 teachers and enrolled 89 students, including 20 mature students.

== Religion ==
The South Korean embassy lists five Korean churches in the Netherlands (three in Amsterdam and one each in Rotterdam, Eindhoven and Leidschendam). The World Buddhist Directory also lists one Korean Buddhist temple, of the Jogye Order, located in Amsterdam.

== Notable people ==
- Mischa Blok (born 1975), radio presenter and writer
- Lavinia Meijer (born 1983), harpist
- Récardo Bruins Choi (born 1985), racecar driver
- Na-Young Jeon (born 1989), actress and singer
- Tristan Dekker (born 1998), football player
- Jasper ter Heide (born 1999), football player
- Jeon Somi (born 2001), singer and dancer

== See also ==
- Netherlands–South Korea relations
- Korean diaspora
- Immigration to the Netherlands
