= Asian Boss =

YouTube channel

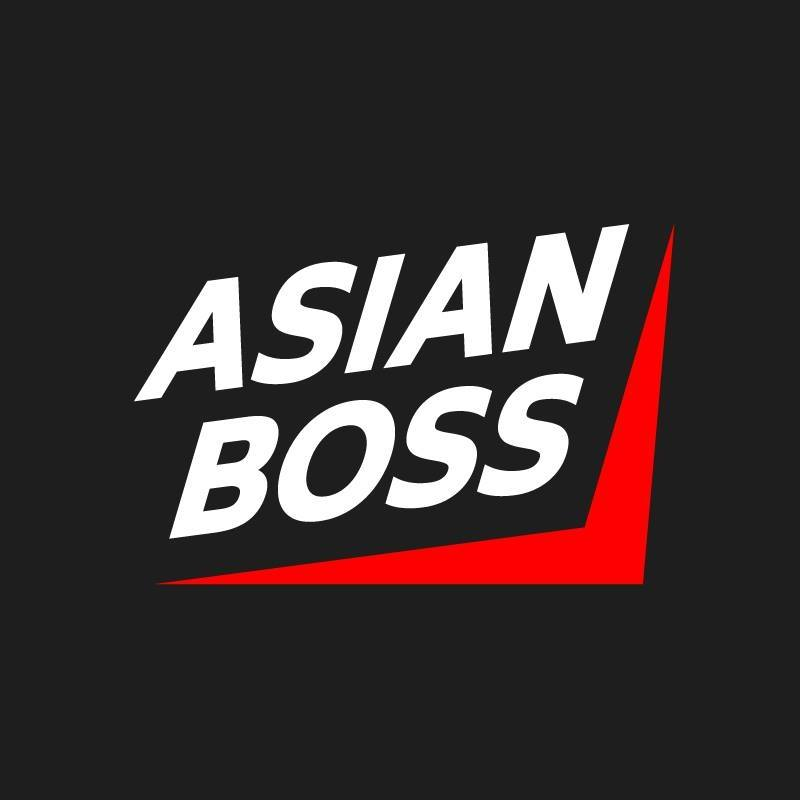

YouTube information
- Channel: Asian Boss
- Years active: 2013–present
- Genres: Current issues; social commentary; documentary
- Subscribers: 4.17 million
- Views: 1.09 billion
- Last updated: 20 November 2026
- Website: asianboss.io

Asian Boss is a YouTube channel, founded in 2013, which discusses issues related to Asia.

== History ==
Asian Boss was founded in 2013 by Stephen Park, a former corporate lawyer, and Kei Ibaraki, a former architect, after they witnessed the "growing divide" in society. Neither of them had video editing experience at the time, and they studied by watching tutorials on YouTube.

Park said many of the videos were demonetized by YouTube for being politically sensitive, and thus they had to rely on investors to fund operations.

In a 2019 interview, Ibaraki said that because of significant media bias on certain topics, the channel would stay as neutral as possible to allow interviewees to speak freely, and would go to great lengths to find respondents with opposing opinions. The channel is targeted for an English-speaking global audience interested in Asia, and 30 percent of its views came from the United States.

In 2019, the channel released a video interviewing the people of Beijing on whether actor Simu Liu was "too ugly" to portray superhero Shang-Chi in Shang-Chi and the Legend of the Ten Rings, which was released in 2021. Liu responded to the video by calling it a "very teachable moment" about facing rejection and doubt from others, and suggested that the channel should tackle topics with "more journalistic and creative integrity." The video was later removed from YouTube.

In 2020, The Japan Times named Asian Boss an example of overseas-based YouTube channels that attempt to gain real insight into the lives and opinions of Japanese.

In January 2021, Park in a video said the channel was close to shutting down, as many of their investors had gone out of business, and announced the channel's GoFundMe page, which has a funding goal of US$700,000. As of February 4, 2021, more than US$745,000 in donations was received.

In January 2022, Taiwan News reported on the accusations by Taiwanese video producer Christopher K. Young that Asian Boss attempted to pre-screen street interviewees in Ximending, Taipei for Kuomintang viewpoints after obtaining interviews from the perspective of the Democratic Progressive Party.

In September 2022, the Asian Boss video titled "Interview with a North Korean Spy" was nominated for Best Asian Documentary at the Asia Contents Awards in South Korea.
