= Goudkantoor =

Building in Groningen, Netherlands

Coordinates: 53°13′06″N 6°33′58″E

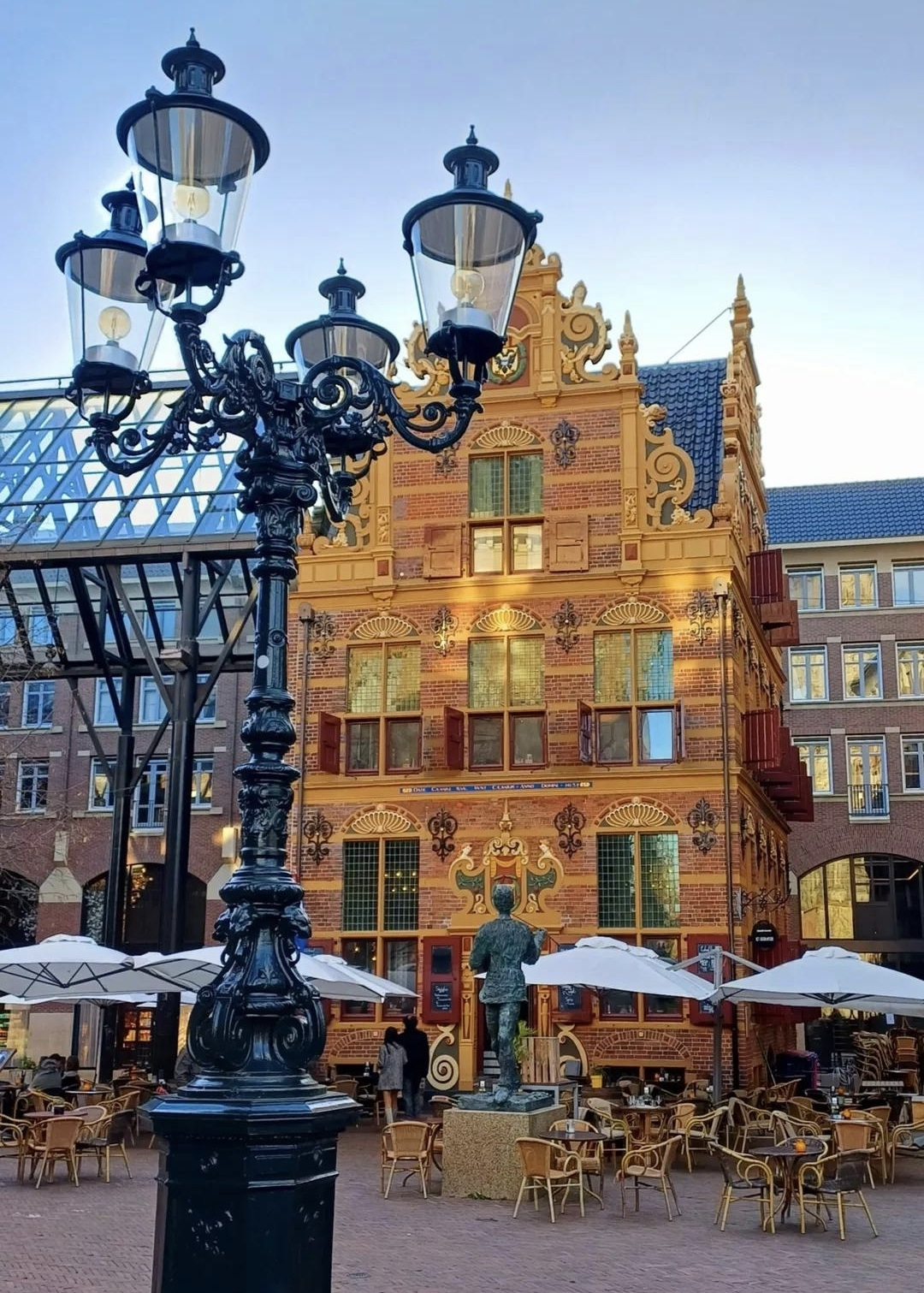
Goudkantoor at Waagplein

The Goudkantoor (English: Gold Office) is a building built in 1635 and located on Waagstraat near the Grote Markt (Main Square) in Groningen, Netherlands. Originally it was built as an office for the receiver of the province of Groningen when it was called Collectehuis.

The text on the building, Date Caesari quae sunt Caesaris (Latin) (English: Render unto Caesar that which is Caesar's) refers to the original function. The coat of arms of the city of Groningen is located on the building.

The name Goudkantoor goes back to 1814-1887, when the Waarborgbureau voor Goud- en Zilverwerken was located in the building. Gold and silver could get a hallmark so people could prove it was real.

Prior to World War II the Northern Ship Transport was located in the building. Just before the liberation of the city, in April 1945, the entire collection was transferred to a building on the north side of the Grote Markt, because the owners were afraid that the Goudkantoor would get damaged during the liberation, but in fact it was one of the few buildings that wasn't heavily damaged, because fire-fighters saved it from burning down.

After the war, the museum was located in the building again for a short time and later it was used as an information centre (Het Stadjershuis) and as a tourist information centre. The Goudkantoor was restored during the construction of the Nieuwe Waagstraat and is currently a restaurant.
