= Hermit kingdom =

Term applied to an isolationist country

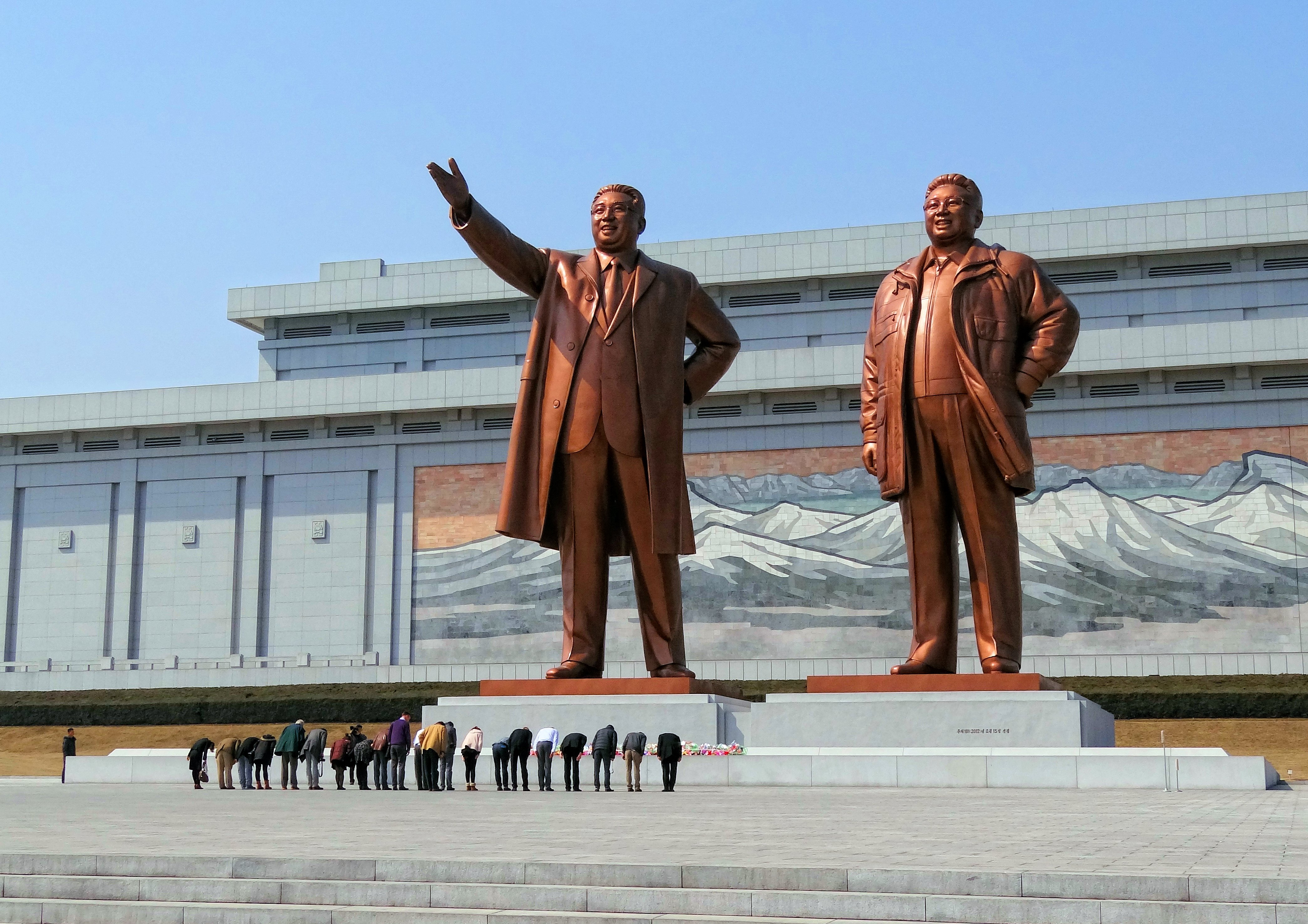
Visitors bow to statues of Kim Il Sung and Kim Jong Il at the Mansudae Grand Monument, Pyongyang.

The term hermit kingdom is an epithet used to refer to any country, organization or society that willfully isolates itself, either metaphorically or physically, from the rest of the world. North Korea is the most commonly cited example of a hermit kingdom-like country due to its Juche state ideology, which is heavily focused on isolationist and self-sufficient internal politics. Other less prominent quoted examples are Turkmenistan, Belarus, Eritrea, and the Islamic Emirate of Afghanistan.

== Korea ==
The first country to be described as a "hermit kingdom" was Korea during the Joseon dynasty, in William Elliot Griffis's 1882 book Korea: The Hermit Nation. Korea, which had become increasingly isolationist since the 17th century, was frequently described as a hermit kingdom until 1905, when it became a protectorate of Japan. Today, historical Korea is split into South Korea and North Korea, two states with starkly contrasting economic ideologies. Whereas South Korea is a major developed economy and trade-dependent economy as well as a major importer of overseas goods, North Korea pursues a largely isolationist state ideology known as Juche with a planned economy.

== Cold War uses ==
During the Cold War, Enver Hoxha's Albania was widely considered a "hermit kingdom", as it was a Stalinist regime which barred ordinary citizens from leaving the country and eventually pursued absolute autarky in hopes of becoming entirely self-sufficient. Unlike North Korea, which was nonetheless allied with other Eastern Bloc states at the time, Hoxha's regime (after the Sino-Albanian split) severed all of its foreign ties, taking on an even more isolationist policy than the former.

== Modern use ==
Today, the term is often applied to North Korea in news and social media, and in 2009, it was used by Hillary Clinton, then the United States Secretary of State. Other current countries considered isolationist "hermit kingdoms" include Turkmenistan, Belarus, Eritrea, and the Islamic Emirate of Afghanistan. Historically, the term has been applied to Nepal, Ladakh, and Bhutan in the Himalayas.

== Other uses ==
The term "hermit kingdom" has also been used by conservative leaders in Australia to describe Western Australia when it closed its borders during the COVID-19 pandemic.

== See also ==
- Haijin – Isolationist policy in early modern China
- Sakoku – Isolationist policy of Japan (1633–1853)
- Kim Il Sung – Leader of North Korea from 1948 to 1994
- Isolationism – Policy against engaging in international relations
