= A. sylvestris =

A. sylvestris may refer to:

- Aerisilvaea sylvestris, a plant species endemic to Tanzania
- Agathaumas sylvestris, a large ceratopsid species that lived in Wyoming during the Late Cretaceous
- Anemone sylvestris, a herbaceous perennial flowering plant species found in dry deciduous woodlands of Central and Western Europe
- Angelica sylvestris, the wild angelica, a plant species
- Anthriscus sylvestris, the cow parsley, wild chervil, wild beaked parsley or keck, a herbaceous biennial plant species
- Adenodus sylvestris, a synonym for Elaeocarpus sylvestris, a tree species found in China, Japan, Korea and Vietnam
