= L. sylvestris =

L. sylvestris may refer to:

- Lathyrus sylvestris, the narrow-leaved everlasting-pea, a plant species
- Lingelsheimia sylvestris, a plant species found in Tanzania
