= List of waterfalls in South Korea =

This is a list of waterfalls in South Korea.

== List of waterfalls of South Korea ==
=== Jeju Special Self-Governing Province ===
This is a list of waterfalls in Jeju Special Self-Governing Province(Korean: 제주특별자치도; Hanja: 濟州特別自治道):

- Cheonjiyeon Waterfall (Korean: 천지연폭포; Hanja: 天地淵瀑布)
- Jeongbang Waterfall (Korean: 정방폭포; Hanja: 正房瀑布)
- Cheonjeyeon Waterfall (Korean: 천제연폭포; Hanja: 天帝淵瀑布)
- Ungtto Waterfall (Korean: 엉또폭포; Hanja: ─瀑布)

=== Gangwon-do ===
This is a list of waterfalls in Gangwon-do (Korean: 강원도; Hanja: 江原道):

- Gugok Waterfall (Korean: 구곡폭포; Hanja: 九谷瀑布)
- Sambuyeon Waterfall (Korean: 삼부연폭포; Hanja: 三釜淵瀑布)
- Jicktang Waterfall (Korean: 직탕폭포; Hanja: 直湯瀑布)
- Deungsun Waterfall (Korean: 등선폭포; Hanja: 登仙瀑布)
- Daeseung Waterfall (Korean: 대승폭포; Hanja: 大勝瀑布)
- Chikso Waterfall (Korean: 칡소폭포)
- Miin Waterfall (Korean: 미인폭포; Hanja: 美人瀑布)
- Yongchu Waterfall (Korean: 용추폭포; Hanja: 龍湫瀑布)
- Garyeong Waterfall (Korean: 가령폭포; Hanja: 可靈瀑布)
- Biryong Waterfall (Korean: 비룡폭포; Hanja: 飛龍瀑布)
- Chundang Waterfall (Korean: 천당폭포; Hanja: 天堂瀑布)
- Pallang Waterfall (Korean: 팔랑폭포; Hanja: 八郞瀑布)
- Maewoldae Waterfall (Korean: 매월대폭포; Hanja: 梅月臺瀑布)
- Gusung Waterfall (Korean: 구성폭포; Hanja: 九聲瀑布)
- Towangseong Waterfall (Korean: 토왕성폭포; Hanja: 土旺城瀑布) – 320 m (1,049 ft) high; the highest waterfall in South Korea
- Ssang Waterfall (Korean: 쌍폭포; Hanja: 雙瀑布)
- Guryeong Waterfall (Korean: 구룡폭포; Hanja: 九龍瀑布)
- Jikyeon Waterfall (Korean: 직연폭포; Hanja: 直淵瀑布)
- Owryeon Waterfall (Korean: 오련폭포; Hanja: 五連瀑布)
- Yukdam Waterfall (Korean: 육담폭포; Hanja: 六潭瀑布)
- Yang Waterfall (Korean: 양폭포; Hanja: 陽瀑布)
- Eum Waterfall (Korean: 음폭포; Hanja: 陰瀑布)

=== Gyeonggi-do ===
This is a list of waterfalls in Gyeonggi-do (Korean: 경기도; Hanja: 京畿道)

- Piano Waterfall (Korean: 피아노폭포; Hanja: 钢琴瀑布)
- Jaein Waterfall (Korean: 재인폭포; Hanja: 才人瀑布)
- Youngso Waterfall (Korean: 용소폭포; Hanja: 龍沼瀑布)
- Ungae Waterfall (Korean: 운계폭포; Hanja: 雲系瀑布)
- Jungwon Waterfall (Korean: 중원폭포; Hanja: 中元瀑布)
- Youngchu Waterfall (Korean: 용추폭포; Hanja: 龍湫瀑布)
- Mujuchae Waterfall (Korean: 무주채폭포; Hanja: 舞酒菜瀑布)
- Mujigae Waterfall (Korean: 무지개폭포; Hanja: 彩虹瀑布)
- Myungji Waterfall (Korean: 명지폭포; Hanja: 明智瀑布)
- Bokhodong Waterfall (Korean: 복호동폭포; Hanja: 伏虎洞瀑布)
- Baeknyun Waterfall (Korean: 백년폭포; Hanja: 百年瀑布)
- Muu Waterfall (Korean: 무우폭포; Hanja: 舞雩瀑布)

=== Gyeongsangbuk-do ===
This is a list of waterfalls in Gyeongsangbuk-do (Korean: 경상북도; Hanja: 慶尙北道)

- Janggak Waterfall (Korean: 장각폭포; Hanja: 長角瀑布)
- Sangseng Waterfall (Korean: 상생폭포; Hanja: 相生瀑布)
- Huibang Waterfall (Korean: 희방폭포; Hanja: 喜方瀑布)
- Bongnae Waterfall (Korean: 봉래폭포; Hanja: 峰來瀑布)
- Yongchu Waterfall (Korean: 용추폭포; Hanja: 龍湫瀑布)
- Osong Waterfall (Korean: 오송폭포; Hanja: 五松瀑布)
- Dalgwi Waterfall (Korean: 달기폭포; Hanja: 達基瀑布)

=== Gyeongsangnam-do ===
This is a list of waterfalls in Gyeongsangnam-do (Korean: 경상남도; Hanja: 慶尙南道)

- Jangyoo Waterfall (Korean: 장유폭포; Hanja: 長游瀑布)
- Mundong Waterfall (Korean: 문동폭포; Hanja: 文洞瀑布)
- Mujigae Waterfall (Korean: 무지개폭포; Hanja: 彩虹瀑布)
- Hongnyong Waterfall (Korean: 홍룡폭포; Hanja: 虹龍瀑布)
- Bulil Waterfall (Korean: 불일폭포; Hanja: 佛日瀑布)
- Guman Waterfall (Korean: 구만폭포; Hanja: 九萬瀑布)
- Hwanggye Waterfall (Korean: 황계폭포; Hanja: 黃溪瀑布)
- Suwol Waterfall (Korean: 수월폭포; Hanja: 水月瀑布)
- Yongchu Waterfall (Korean: 용추폭포; Hanja: 龍湫瀑布)
- Seonyudong Waterfall (Korean: 선유동폭포; Hanja: 仙遊洞瀑布)

=== Ulsan Metropolitan City ===
This is a list of waterfalls in Ulsan Metropolitan City (Korean: 울산광역시; Hanja: 蔚山廣域市)

- Paraeso Waterfall (Korean: 파래소폭포; Hanja: 波來沼瀑布)
- Hongryu Waterfall (Korean: 홍류폭포; Hanja: 洪流瀑布)

=== Jeollabuk-do ===
This is a list of waterfalls in Jeollabuk-do (Korean: 전라북도; Hanja: 全羅北道)

- Jikso Waterfall (Korean: 직소폭포; Hanja: 直沼瀑布)
- Wibong Waterfall (Korean: 위봉폭포; Hanja: 威鳳瀑布)
- Guryoung Waterfall (Korean: 구룡폭포; Hanja: 九龍瀑布)
- Chunil Waterfall (Korean: 천일폭포; Hanja: 天一瀑布)

=== Jeollanam-do ===
This is a list of waterfalls in Jeollabnam-do (Korean: 전라남도; Hanja: 全羅南道)

- Surak Waterfall (Korean: 수락폭포; Hanja: 水落瀑布)
- Manyeon Waterfall (Korean: 만연폭포; Hanja: 萬淵瀑布)
- Yongchu Waterfall (Korean: 용추폭포; Hanja: 龍湫瀑布)
- Guam Waterfall (Korean: 구암폭포; Hanja: 龜巖瀑布)
- Sapyung Waterfall (Korean: 사평폭포; Hanja: 沙坪瀑布)

=== Chungcheongbuk-do ===
This is a list of waterfalls in Chungcheongbuk-do (Korean: 충청북도; Hanja: 忠淸北道)

- Suok Waterfall (Korean: 수옥폭포; Hanja: 漱玉瀑布)
- Okgae Waterfall (Korean: 옥계폭포; Hanja: 玉溪瀑布)
- Yongchu Waterfall (Korean: 용추폭포; Hanja: 龍湫瀑布)
- Suryoung Waterfall (Korean: 수룡폭포; Hanja: 水龍瀑布)
- Yongdam Waterfall (Korean: 용담폭포; Hanja: 龍潭瀑布)

=== Chungcheongnam-do ===
This is a list of waterfalls in Chungcheongbnam-do (Korean: 충청남도; Hanja: 忠淸南道)

- Sipyi Waterfall (Korean: 십이폭포; Hanja: 十二瀑布)
- Eunsun Waterfall (Korean: 은선폭포; Hanja: 隱仙瀑布)
- Gunji Waterfall (Korean: 군지폭포; Hanja: 郡誌瀑布)

== See also ==
- List of waterfalls
