= Seonim Bridge =

Bridge in Jeju, South Korea

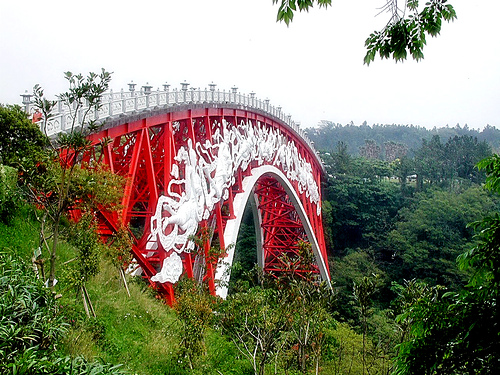
- Coordinates: 33°15′06″N 126°25′00″E
- Crosses: Cheonjeyeon Waterfalls

Characteristics
- Total length: 128 m (420 ft)
- Width: 4 m (13 ft)
- Height: 78 m (256 ft)

History
- Construction end: 1984; 42 years ago
- Construction cost: ₩400 million

Statistics
- Daily traffic: Pedestrian
- Toll: Yes for tourists

Korean name
- Hangul: 선임교
- Hanja: 仙臨僑
- RR: Seonimgyo
- MR: Sŏnimgyo

Location
- Interactive map of Seonim Bridge

Seonim Bridge (Korean: 선임교) is an arch bridge on Jeju Island over Cheonjeyeon Waterfall that has seven nymphs carved on both sides. It crosses from east to west over the stream between the second and third tiers of Cheonjeyeon waterfall.

The bridge is also called Seven Nymphs Bridge (Korean: 칠선녀교; RR: Chilseonyeogyo). The nymphs symbolize the Korean legend of the descent of seven beautiful nymphs from heaven at night. Seonimgyo Bridge is the first bridge with Ojakgyo (오작교) design in the region. It was completed in 1984, and cost the Korea Tourism Organization about ₩400 million to construct. There is a fee for tourists who use the bridge. The bridge features 100 balusters and 34 stone lanterns that light up at night. On the bridge's steel columns, there are 14 nymphs, 7 on each side with each nymph about 20 metres (66 ft) in length. All the nymphs are playing their own musical instruments.

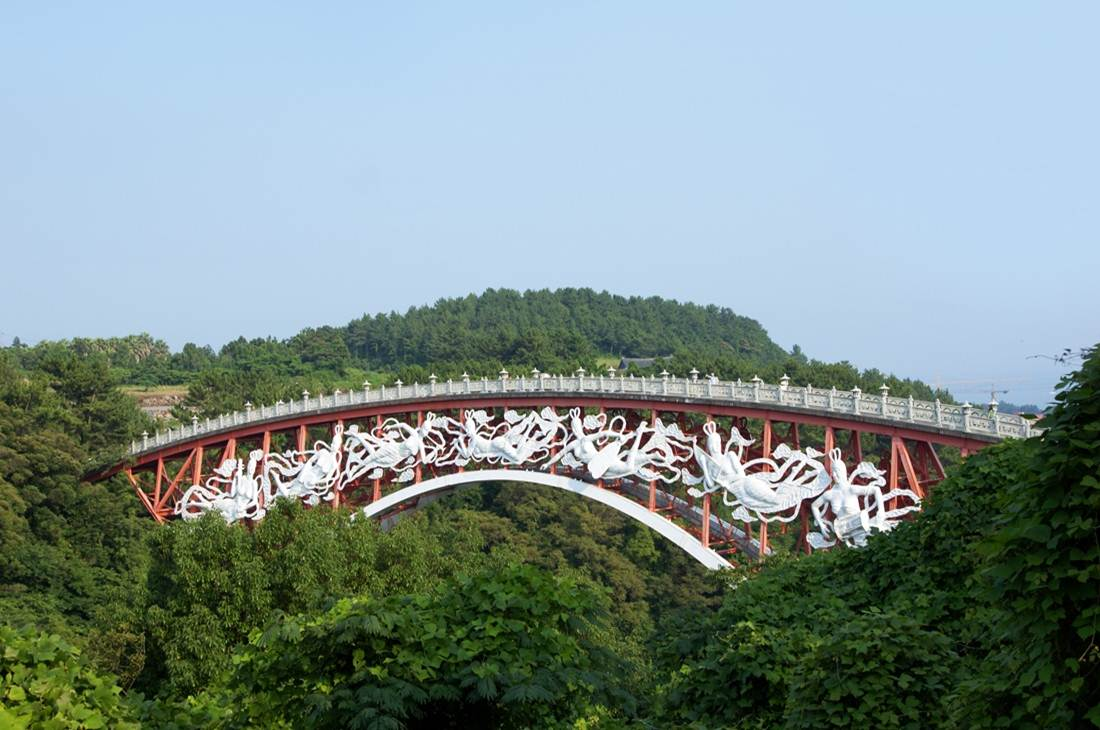
Seonimgyo Bridge

Seonim Bridge is 128 metres (420 ft) in length, 78 metres (256 ft) in height, 4 metres (13 ft) in width, and 230 tonnes (510,000 lb) in weight.

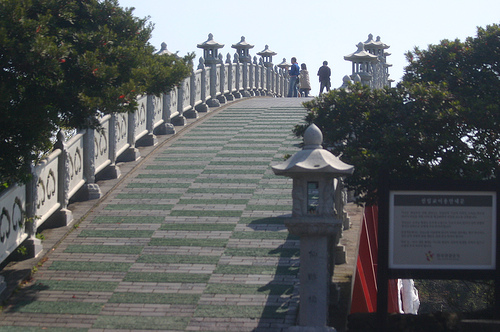
Entrance to Seonimgyo Bridge

It is a tourist attraction on Jeju-do. The bridge connects Cheonjeyeon with the Jungmun Tourist Complex, and is intended for pedestrian use.
