= Cheonjeyeon Waterfalls =

Waterfalls on Jeju Island, South Korea

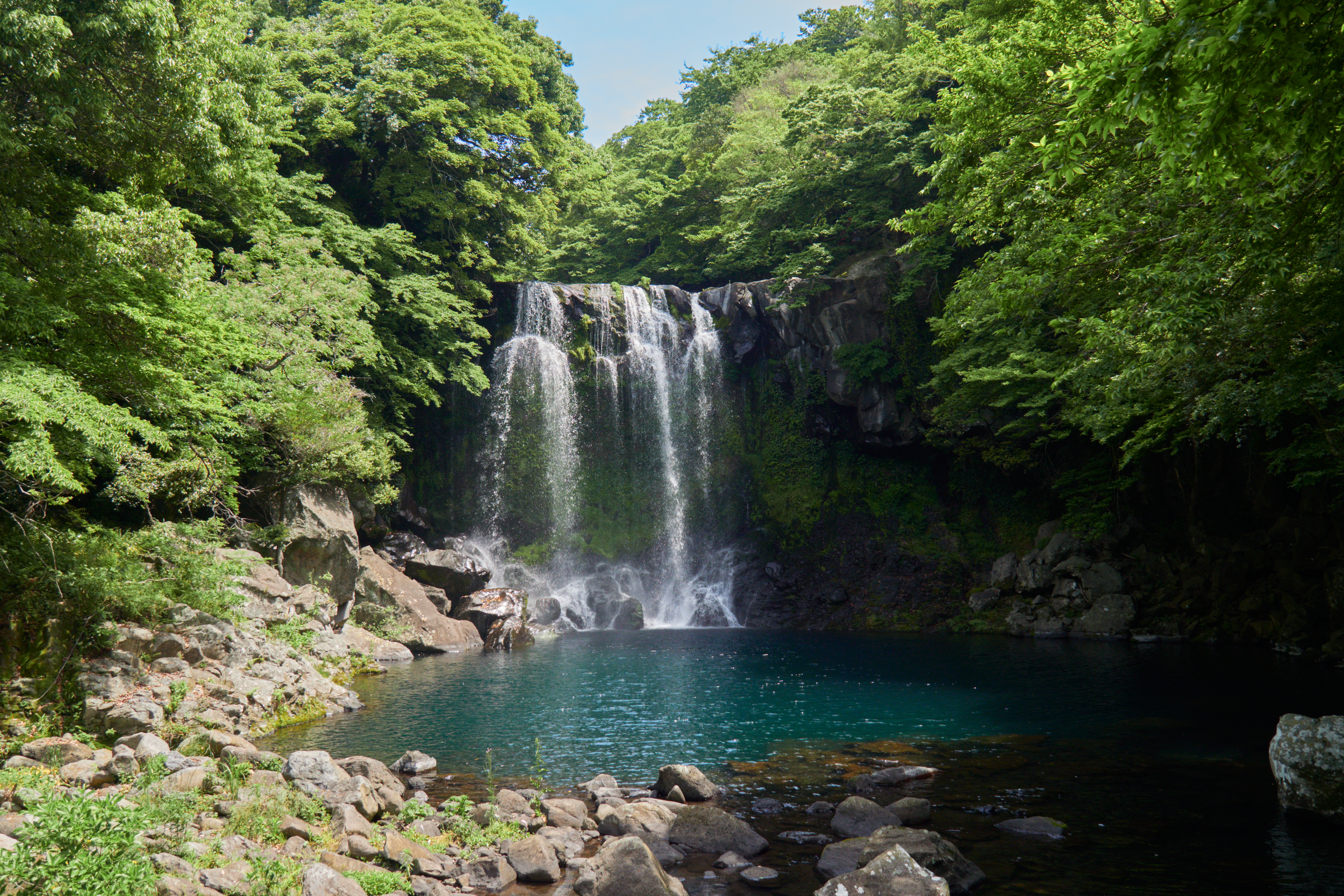
- The second tier, cascading into the pool
- Interactive map of Cheonjeyeon Waterfalls
- Location: Jeju Province, South Korea
- Coordinates: 33.2528°N 126.4173°E
- Number of drops: 3

- Cheonjeyeon Waterfalls
- Hangul: 천제연폭포
- Hanja: 天帝淵瀑布
- RR: Cheonjeyeon pokpo
- MR: Ch'ŏnjeyŏn p'okp'o

Cheonjeyeon Waterfall (Korean: 천제연폭포) is a three-tier waterfall located on Jeju Island, South Korea. The falls are a popular tourist attraction, and one of the three famous waterfalls of Jeju, alongside Cheonjiyeon Waterfall and Jeongbang Waterfall.

== Description ==
Cheonjeyeon means Pond of the Emperor of Heaven.

According to Korean legend, seven nymphs would descend from the heavens at night and bathe in the waterfall's pond. Since ancient times, it is thought that standing under the waterfall on the 15th day of the seventh lunar month can cure diseases by the eighth lunar month, though swimming is now prohibited. Cold water flows out of the ceiling of a cave to make the waterfall. Between the precipice of the waterfall and the lower clay layer, water springs out. In first cascade, the cliff is 22 m (72 ft) high and the water falls into Cheonjeyeon Pond which is 21 m (69 ft) deep. From there, the water goes to the second waterfall and falls 30 m (98 ft) and continues to the third waterfall. Eventually, the water reaches the ocean.

Above the falls is Seonimgyo Bridge, which symbolizes the legend of Cheonjeyeon. The warm temperate forest around Cheonjeyeon Waterfall was designated Natural Monument No. 378 in 1993 because of the rare plants it contains and its value for scientific research. Rare plants such as the solipnan (솔잎난) plants or skeleton fork fern (Psilotum nudum) can be found around the falls in the crevices of rocks.

On the May of even-numbered years, the Chilseonyeo (Seven Nymphs) Festival is held at this location.

== Gallery ==
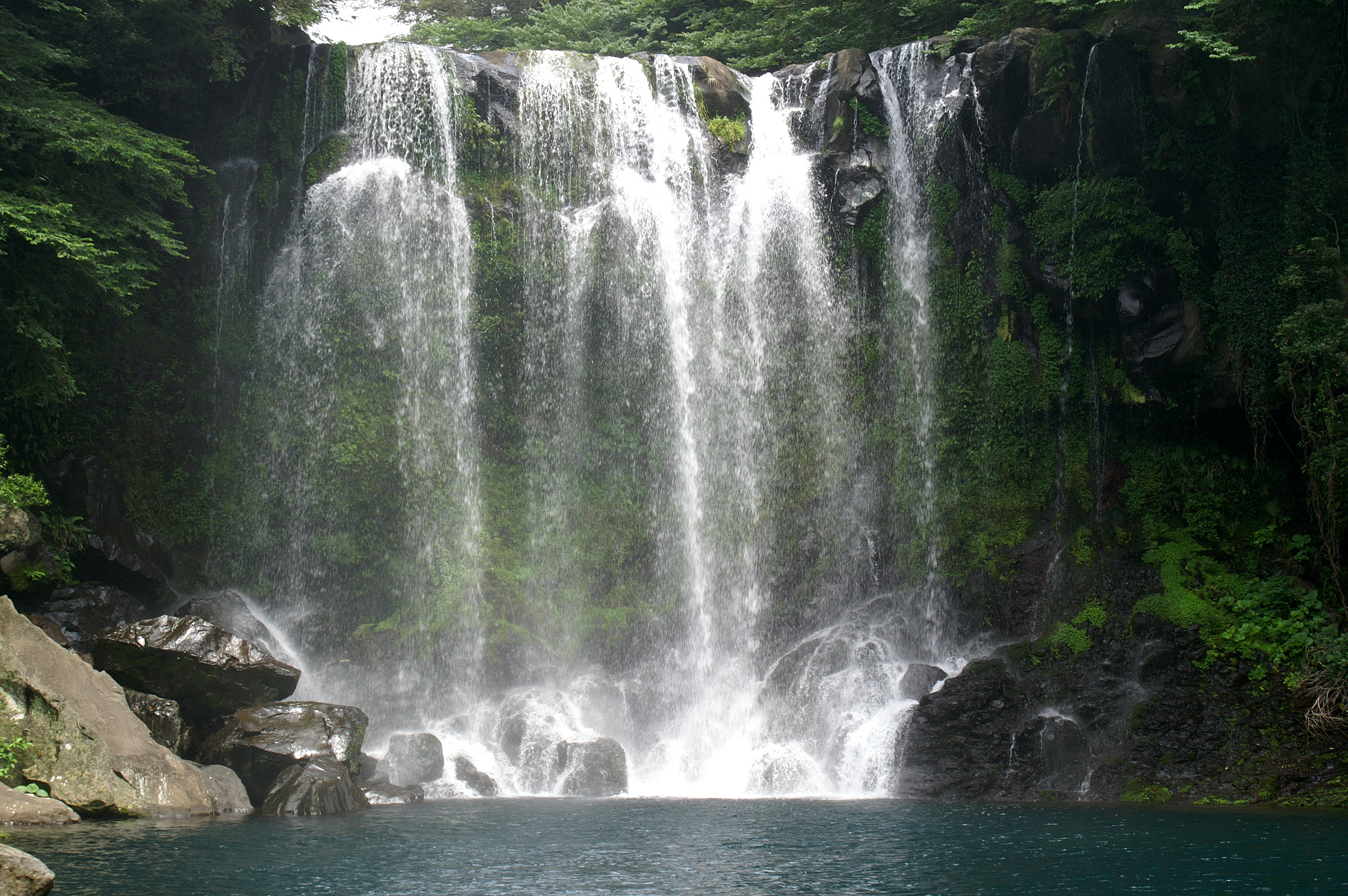
Second tier of the waterfall

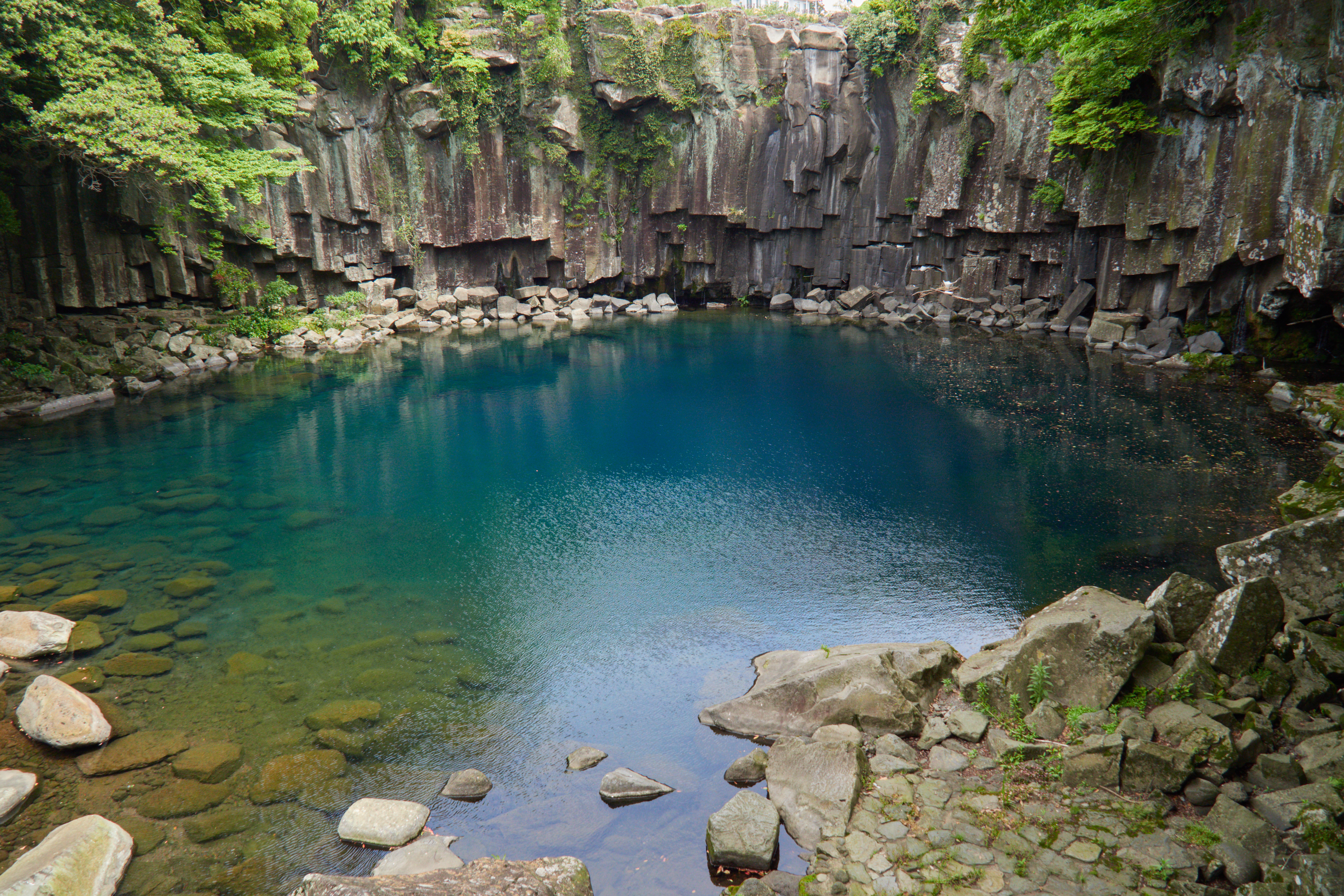
The first tier, surrounded by columnar basalt cliffs.

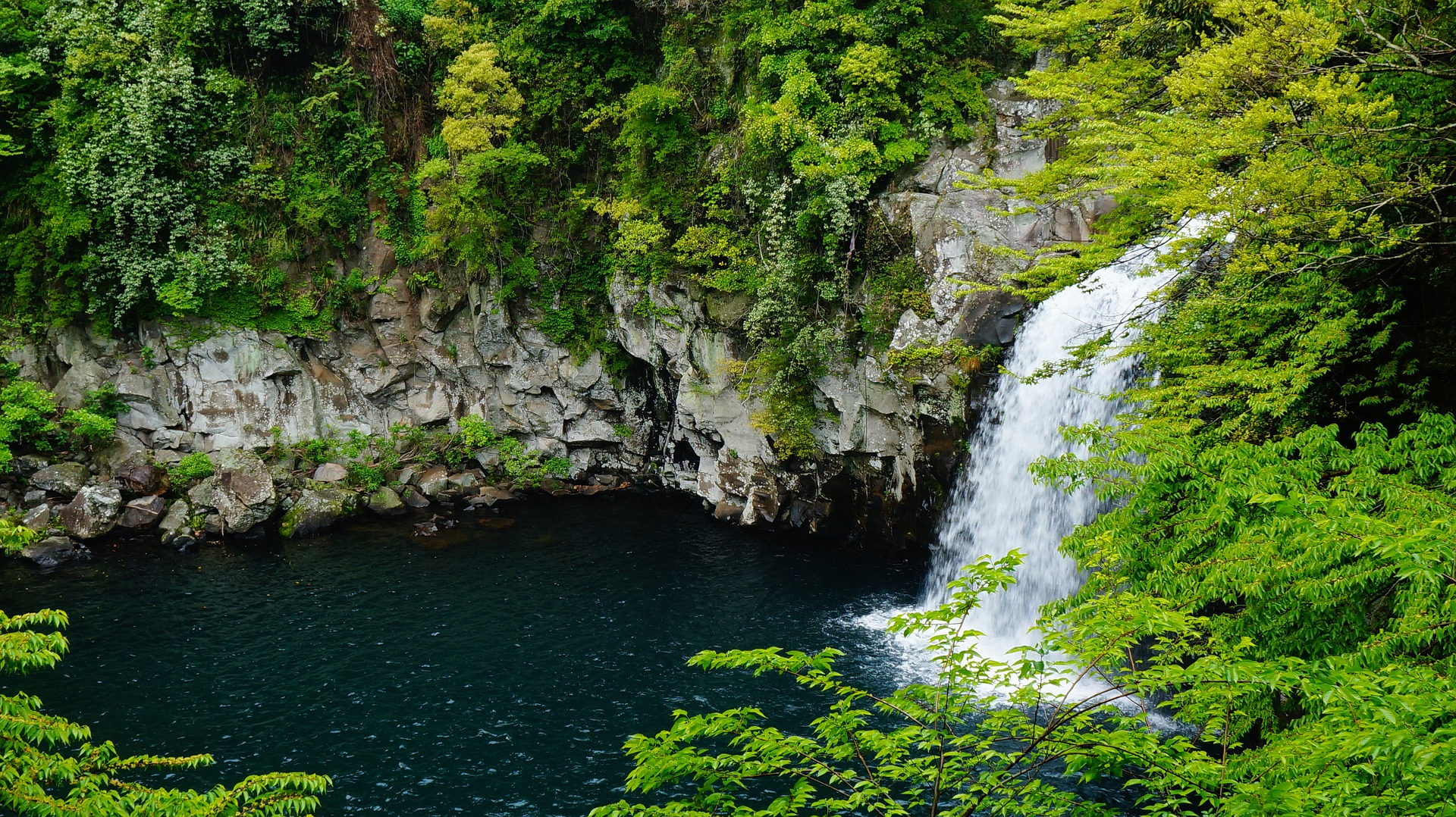
Third tier

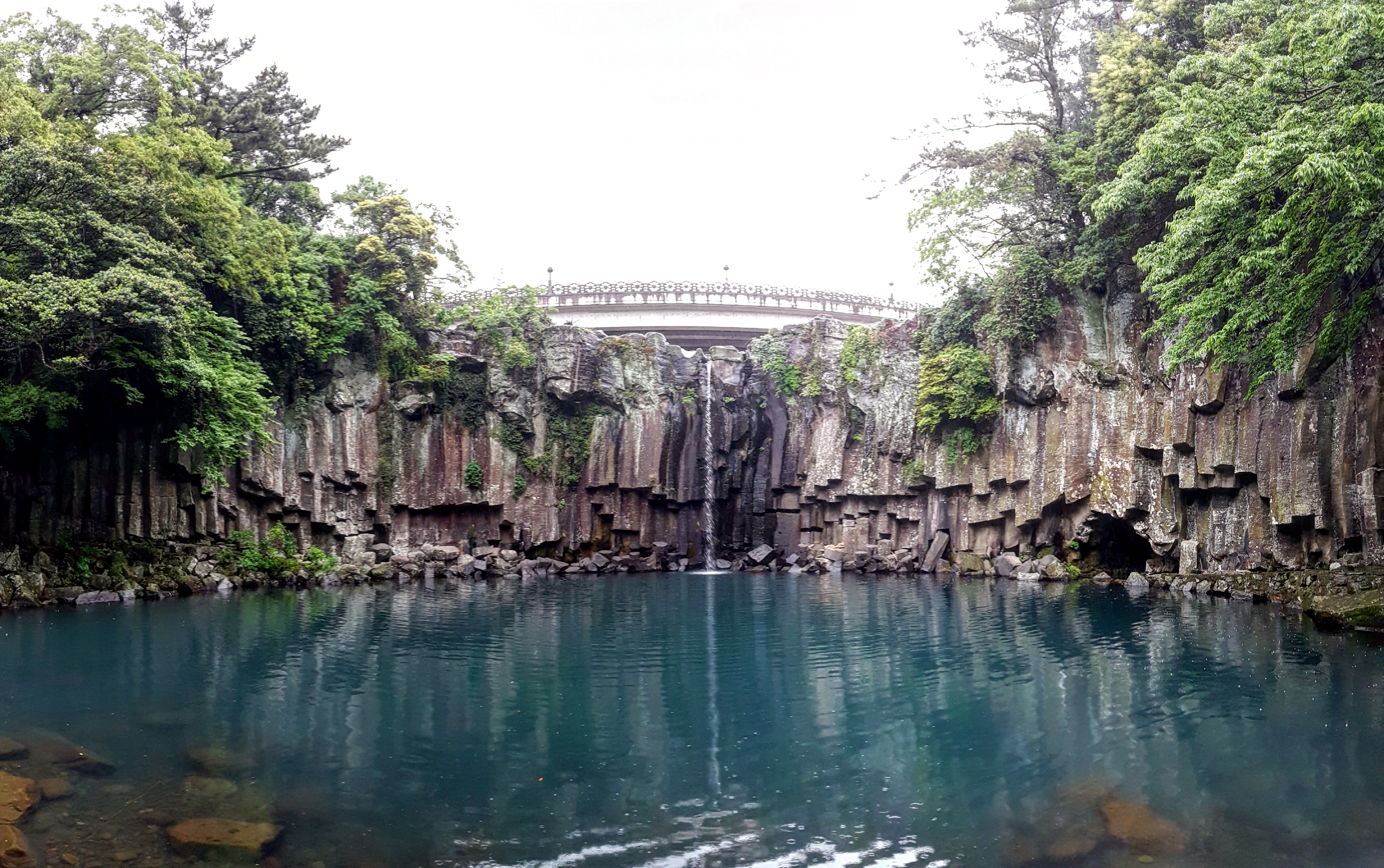
First tier going into Cheonjeyeon Pond, only active after heavy rain.

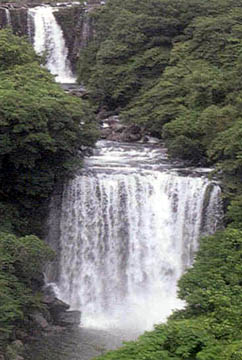
First two tiers of the waterfall (2004)

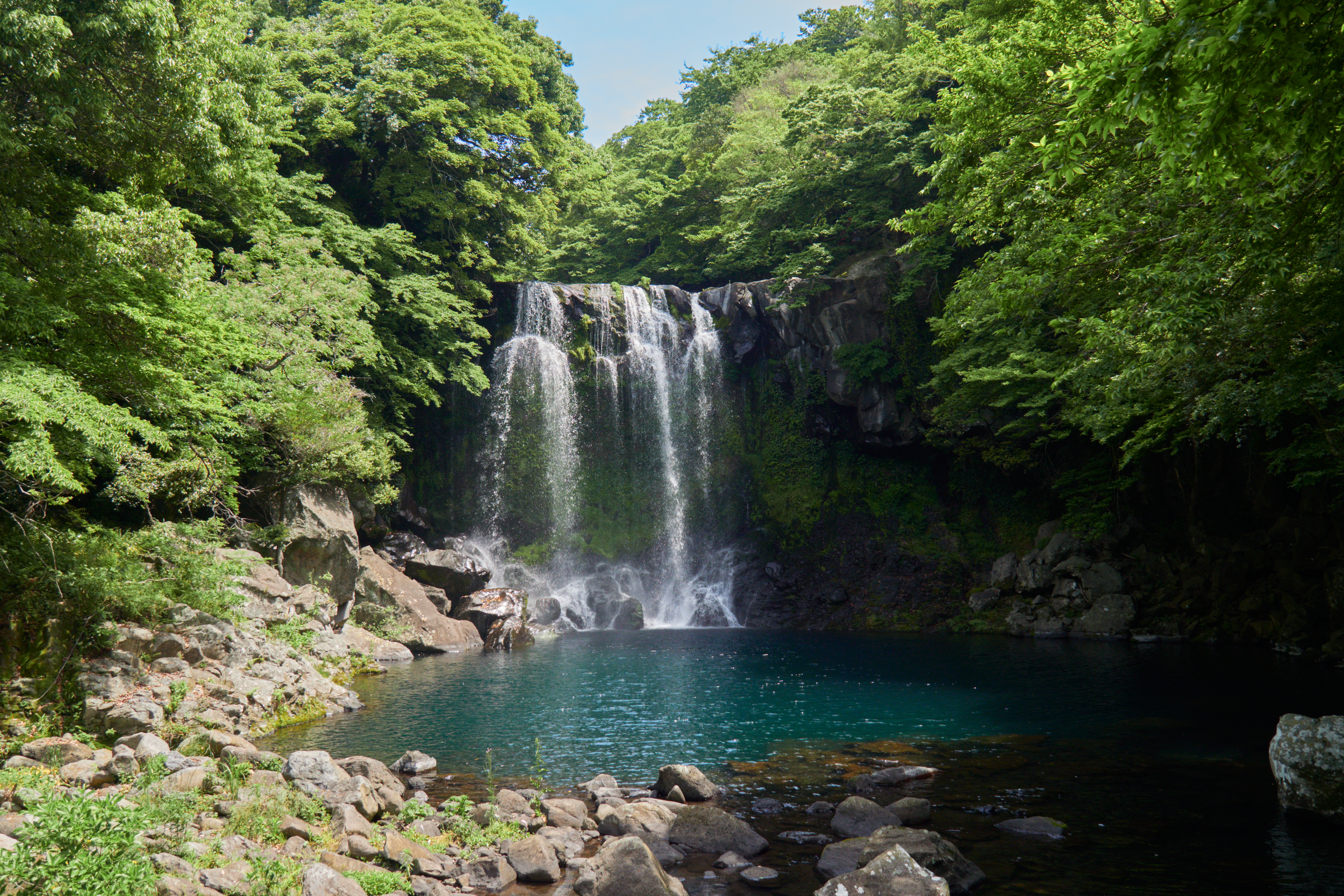
Cheonjeyeon Waterfall, second tier, cascading into the pool.

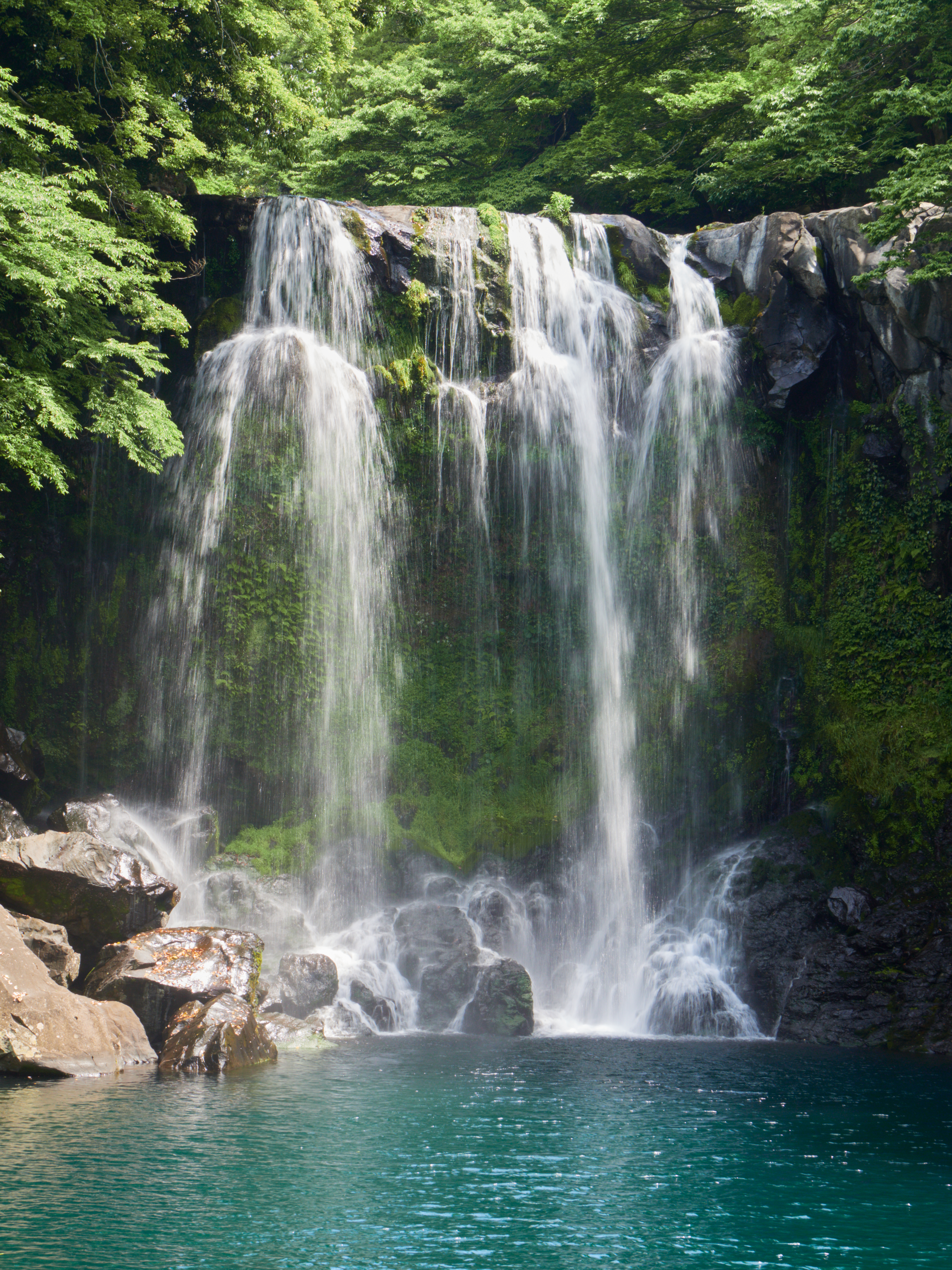
Closer look at the second tier.

== See also ==
- List of waterfalls
- List of waterfalls of South Korea
