= Leucoblepsis fenestraria =

Scientific classification
- Domain: Eukaryota
- Kingdom: Animalia
- Phylum: Arthropoda
- Class: Insecta
- Order: Lepidoptera
- Family: Drepanidae
- Genus: Leucoblepsis
- Species: L. fenestraria

Binomial name
- Leucoblepsis fenestraria (Moore, [1868])

Synonyms
- Drepanodes fenestraria Moore, [1868]; Leucoblepsis ostia C. Swinhoe, 1903

Species of hook-tip moth

Leucoblepsis fenestraria is a moth in the family Drepanidae. It was described by Frederic Moore in 1868. It is found in the north-eastern Himalayas, Taiwan and on Peninsular Malaysia and Borneo.

Adults are whitish cinereous (ash grey), with two widely separated wavy brown lines from the abdominal margin to the costa before the apex. Between these on the forewings, is a diaphanous spot crossed by two veins. There is a submarginal and marginal row of white lunules, the former concave exteriorly and the latter interiorly and bordered by a brown marginal line.
