= Cheonjiyeon Waterfall =

Waterfall on Jeju Island, South Korea

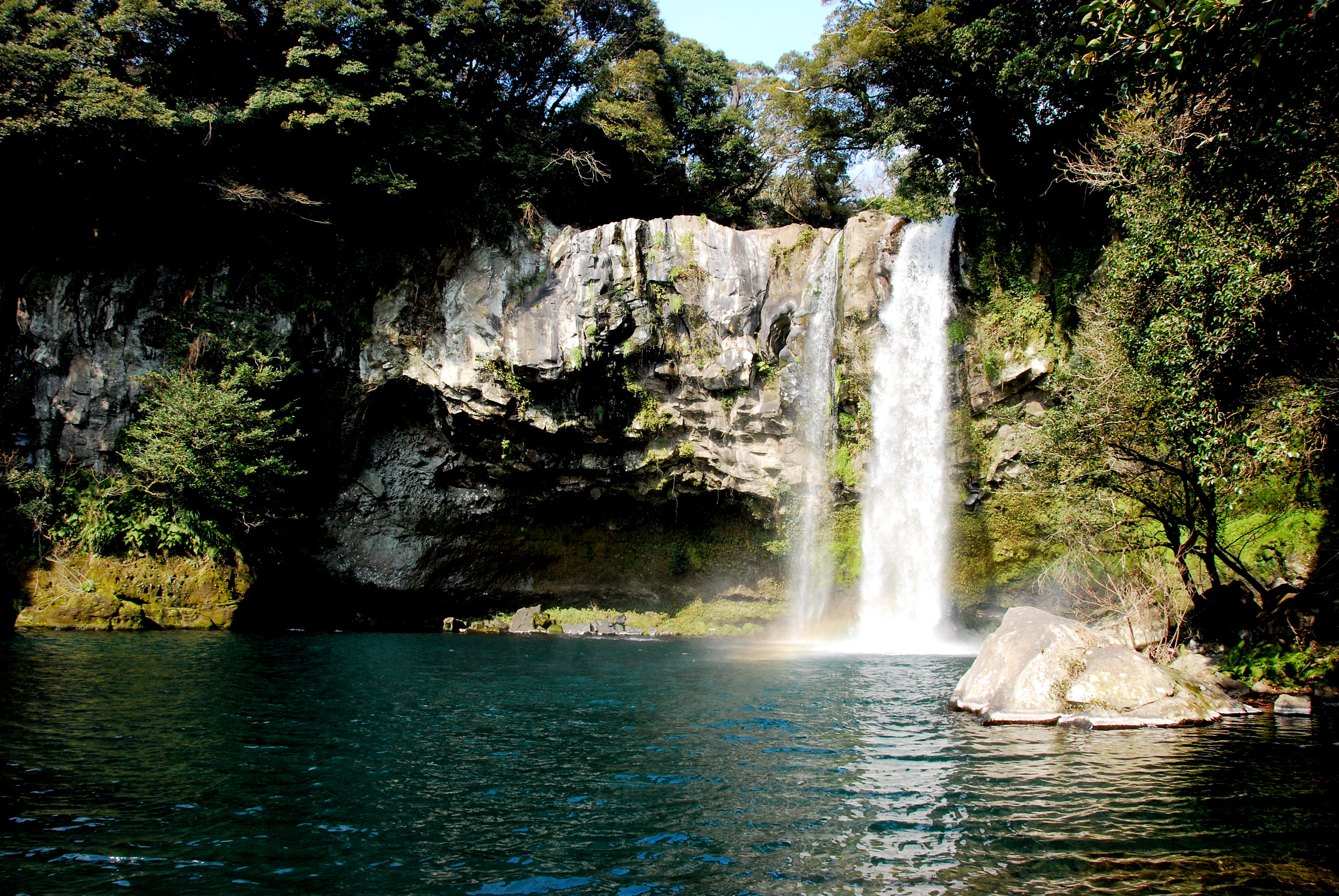
- The falls (2008)
- Interactive map of Cheonjiyeon Waterfall
- Location: Jeju Province, South Korea
- Coordinates: 33°14′49.0″N 126°33′15.9″E
- Total height: 22 m (72 ft)
- Number of drops: 1
- Total width: 12 m (39 ft)

- Cheonjiyeon Waterfall
- Hangul: 천지연폭포
- Hanja: 天地淵瀑布
- RR: Cheonjiyeon pokpo
- MR: Ch'ŏnjiyŏn p'okp'o

Cheonjiyeon Waterfall (Korean: 천지연폭포) is a waterfall on Jeju Island, South Korea. It is 22 m (72 ft) high and 12 m (39 ft) wide. It is one of the main tourist attractions on Jeju, particularly when they are illuminated at night. At night, the "Hidden Face," a formation of rocks, may be visible with the night lights.

== Description ==
Its name implies it is a meeting point between sky and land, as cheon means sky, and ji means land.

Though water always falls in one particular area, depending on the amount of recent rain, the water may spread out. At the bottom of the waterfall is an artificial pond that is 20 m (66 ft) deep. Two small dams help keep the water at a specific level.

Large volcanic rocks form landbridges that allow tourists to pose for photographs in front of the falls. These falls are characterized by its trachyte andesite rocks. The source of Cheonjiyeon Waterfall is a spring that comes out of the floor of the Somban Stream. The stream Yeonhee-chun is the source of the waterfall. The waterfall is one of the three famous waterfalls of Jeju, the other two being Cheonjeyeon Waterfall and Jeongbang Waterfall.

The Cheonjiyeon Waterfall is also known for its diverse plant and animal life, as the path to the waterfall goes through a garden of subtropical plants. Migratory ducks, Elaeocarpus sylvestris var. ellipticus (Natural Monument no. 163), Psilotum nudum, and Castanopsis cuspidata var. sieboldii, Xylosma congesta, and Camellia are some examples of the flora and fauna around the falls. Its pond is known for being a habitat of the marbled eel (Anguilla marmorata), which is mainly active at night. Known as the Mutae (무태) eel, it is classified in Korea as Natural Monument no. 27.

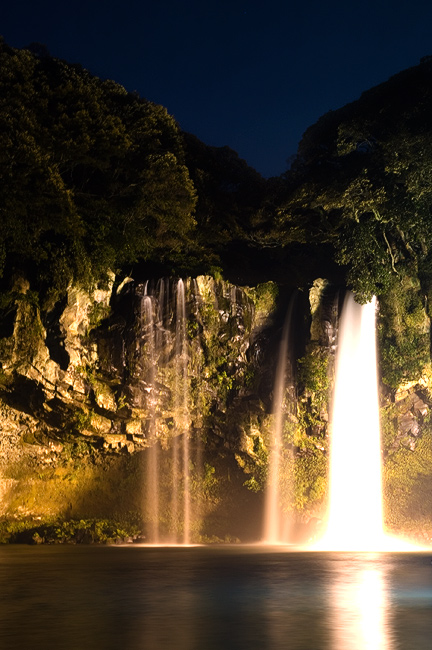
The falls illuminated at night (2007)

In order to reach the waterfall, visitors must walk on a landscaped trail. Near the beginning of the path is a traditional Korean raft (테우; teu). Just before reaching the falls on the path, one must cross a bridge from which a wide variety of koi fish can be seen below. Along the way are three piles of stacked or balanced rocks. In olden days, a person would place a small stone under a larger stone and pray for the health and prosperity of their family.

== See also ==
- List of waterfalls
- List of waterfalls in South Korea
