= Biryong Falls =

Waterfall in Sokcho, South Korea

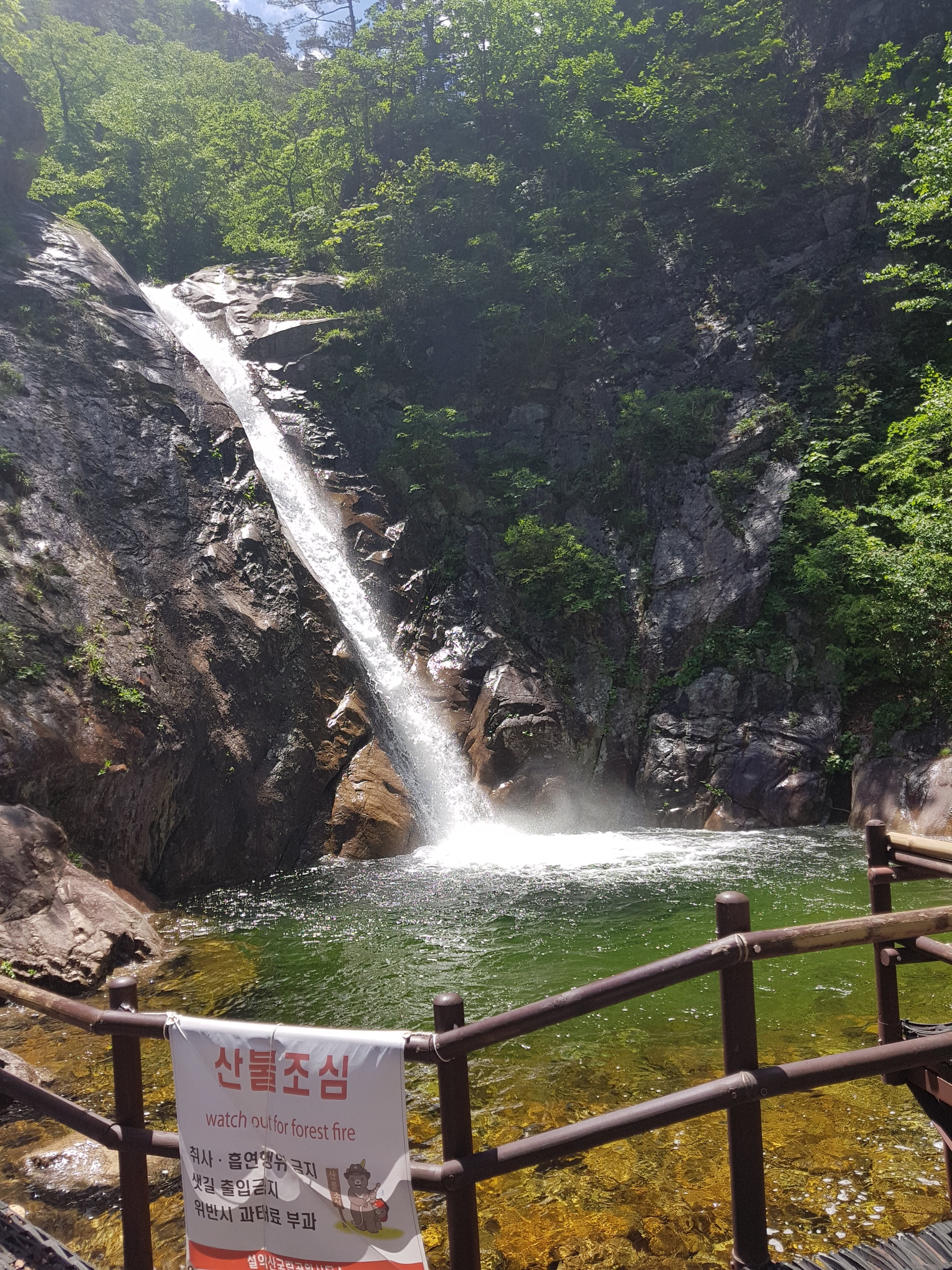
- Location: Sokcho; 38°09′37″N 128°30′00″E
- Use: Hiking
- Difficulty: Grade C : A bit of slow, the difficulty is low

Biryong Falls (Korean: 비룡폭포) is a waterfall in Seoraksan National Park in Sokcho, located halfway between Yukdam Falls and Towangseong Waterfall. The loud falling water of falls is said to resemble dragons flying up towards the sky, which is why it was named Biryong (flying dragon) Falls. The frozen waterfall in winter is another magnificent sight.

== History ==
"Long ago, the villagers suffered from a dire drought. The villagers found that a dragon stopped the flow of the stream from the fall. They offered a maid as a sacrifice. Then, the dragon disappeared into the sky, thus letting the stream flow." "Biryong" literally means a flying dragon.

Bathing or playing in water is not allowed within the Seoraksan area for protection of water quality. No littering is allowed. No natural object, even a single stone, cannot be taken out of the National Park.
