= Leucoblepsis neoma =

Scientific classification
- Domain: Eukaryota
- Kingdom: Animalia
- Phylum: Arthropoda
- Class: Insecta
- Order: Lepidoptera
- Family: Drepanidae
- Genus: Leucoblepsis
- Species: L. neoma

Binomial name
- Leucoblepsis neoma (Swinhoe, 1905)

Synonyms
- Problepsidis neoma Swinhoe, 1905

Species of hook-tip moth

Leucoblepsis neoma is a moth in the family Drepanidae. It was described by Charles Swinhoe in 1905. It is found in Singapore and on Peninsular Malaysia, Sumatra and Borneo.

Adults are white, suffused with pale chestnut-brown irrorations (sprinkles) in parts. There are two nearly straight brown lines from the abdominal margin of the hindwings. The first from one-third, the other from the middle, running parallel across both wings and suddenly converge on the middle of vein 5 of the forewings, and run from there in a single line to the costa near the apex. Between these lines on the forewings is a large hyaline (glass-like) spot and the rest of the wing is lightly suffused. There is a fairly broad pale pinkish band on the outer margin, composed of large pale pinkish spots joined together. The marginal line is brown. The hindwings have a nearly white inner area, the outer area from the outer line to the margin with dark suffusion and a dentated white line through the middle of the disc. The marginal line is white.
