= Jeongbang Waterfall =

Tidefall on Jeju Island, South Korea

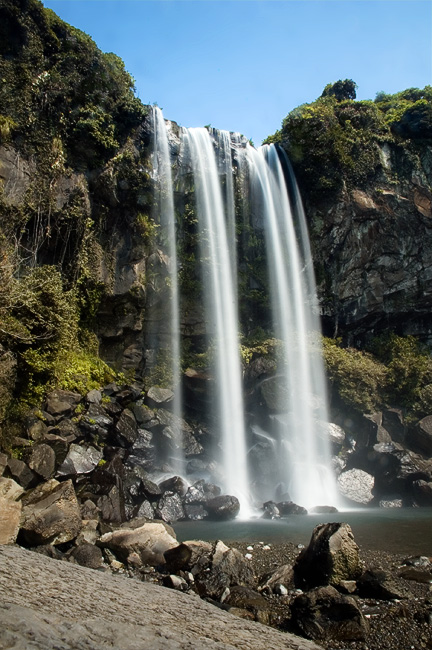
- A long-exposure image of the waterfall (2007)
- Interactive map of Jeongbang Waterfall
- Location: Seogwipo, Jeju Province, South Korea
- Coordinates: 33.244649°N 126.571662°E
- Total height: 23 m (75 ft)
- Number of drops: 1
- Total width: 8 m (26 ft)

- Jeongbang Waterfall
- Hangul: 정방폭포
- Hanja: 正房瀑布
- RR: Jeongbang pokpo
- MR: Chŏngbang p'okp'o

Jeongbang Waterfall (Korean: 정방폭포) is a waterfall and popular tourist attraction located in Seogwipo, Jeju Province, South Korea. The waterfall is 23 m (75 ft) high and is very close to the ocean. Depending on the level of recent rainfall, it can be up 8 m (26 ft) wide. The source of the waterfall is the stream Donghong-cheon. It is considered to be one of Yeongjusipgeong, the ten greatest scenic wonders of Jeju Island.

Legend states that a holy dragon lived underneath it. It was said that the dragon's spirit is contained in the water which can cure diseases and bring rain during drought. Furthermore, a nearby small waterfall is said to resemble a servant waiting on a lord.

A legend states that Emperor Qin Shi Huang of China (259 BC – 210 BC) sent a servant, Seobul, to fetch the magical herbs of eternal youth from the island's mountain Hallasan. Though he failed to find the herb, he encountered Jeongbang Falls on the way and he left his autograph, Seobul Gwaji (which literally means "Seobul was here"), on the cliff wall, where it no longer remains. An inscription on the wall of the waterfall saying "Seobulgwacha", refers to Seobul's journey. The waterfall is one of the three famous waterfalls of Jeju, along with Cheonjiyeon Waterfall and Cheonjeyeon Waterfall. A smaller waterfall, Sojeongbang Waterfall is 300 m to the east.

The waterfall is also known to be a location related to the 1948 Jeju uprising. Civilians caught up in the uprising were executed near the falls, and their bodies were disposed of over the waterfall.

== See also ==
- List of waterfalls
- List of waterfalls in South Korea
