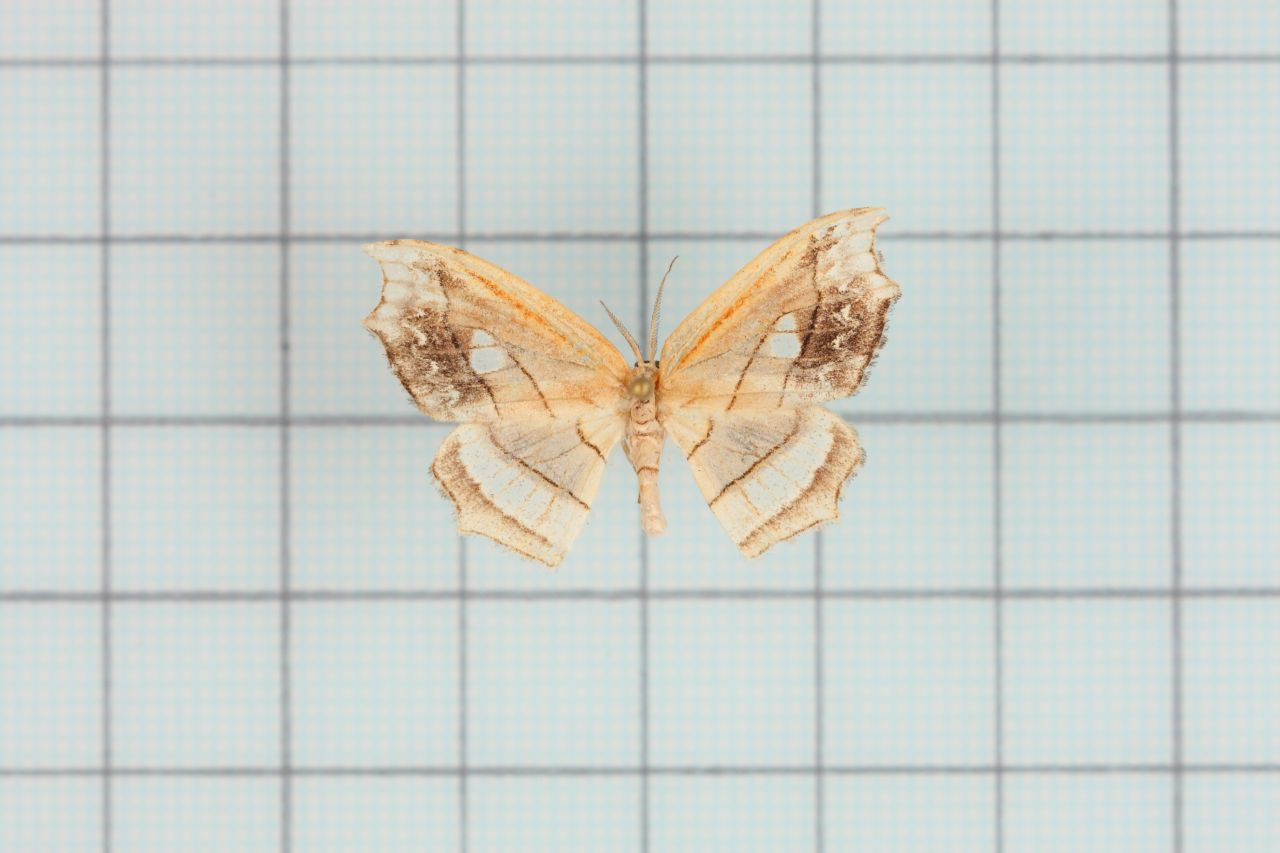

Scientific classification
- Kingdom: Animalia
- Phylum: Arthropoda
- Class: Insecta
- Order: Lepidoptera
- Family: Drepanidae
- Genus: Leucoblepsis
- Species: L. excisa

Binomial name
- Leucoblepsis excisa (Hampson, 1892)

Synonyms
- Drepana excisa Hampson, 1892; Problepsidis carneotincta Warren, 1901; Leucobrepsis excisa

= Leucoblepsis excisa =

Species of hook-tip moth

Leucoblepsis excisa is a moth in the family Drepanidae first described by George Hampson in 1892. It is found in the north-eastern Himalayas, Peninsular Malaysia, Sumatra and Borneo. Records for Taiwan, refer to the species Leucoblepsis taiwanensis.

The wingspan is 22–31 mm. Adults have been recorded in January, March, May and December.

The larvae feed on the leaves of Elaeocarpus sylvestris.
