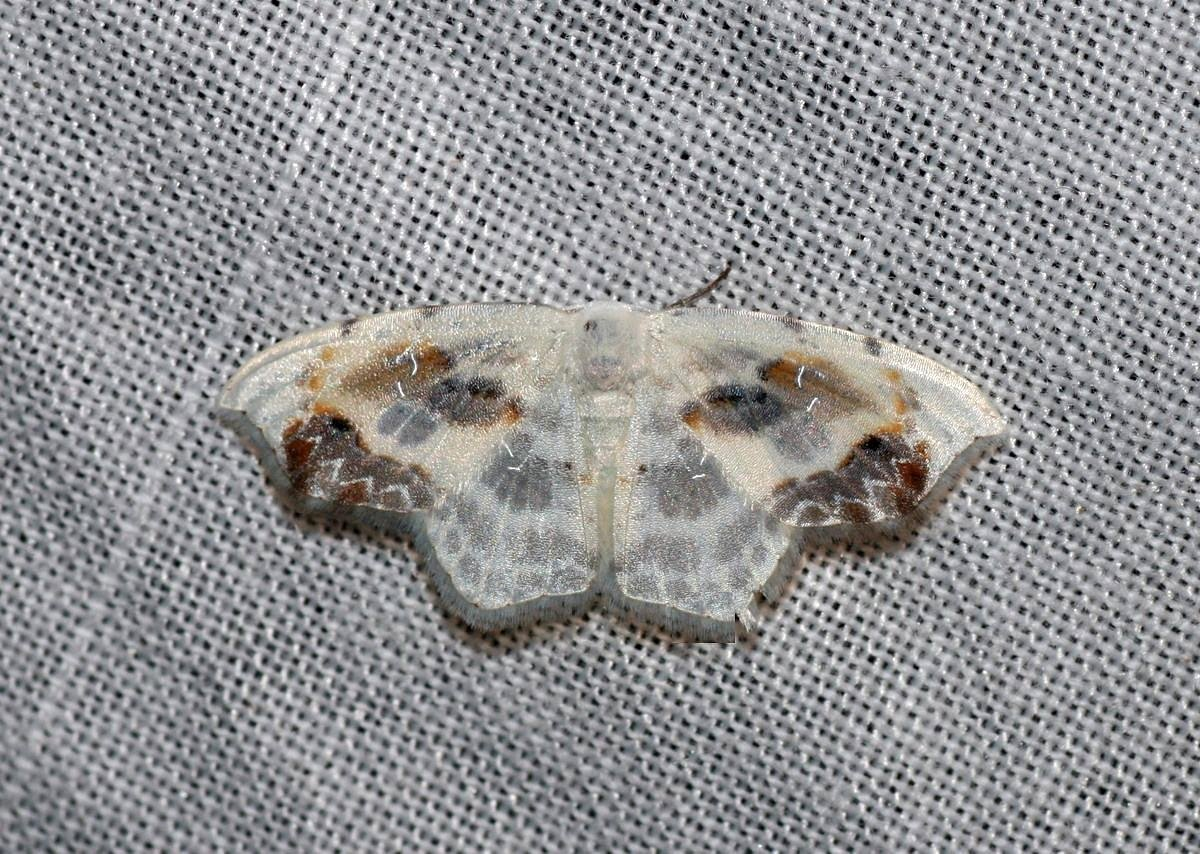

Scientific classification
- Kingdom: Animalia
- Phylum: Arthropoda
- Clade: Pancrustacea
- Class: Insecta
- Order: Lepidoptera
- Family: Drepanidae
- Genus: Leucoblepsis
- Species: L. renifera

Binomial name
- Leucoblepsis renifera (Warren, 1900)

Synonyms
- Gonocilix renifera Warren, 1900; Problepsidis tristis Swinhoe, 1905

= Leucoblepsis renifera =

Species of hook-tip moth

Leucoblepsis renifera is a moth in the family Drepanidae. It was described by Warren in 1900. It is found on Peninsular Malaysia, Sumatra and Borneo.

== Physical description ==
The wingspan is about 28 mm. The forewings are white, with a large, slightly oblique, kidney-shaped blotch of ochreous and grey scales just before the middle of the inner margin, reaching to the upper margin of the cell and extending beyond it between veins 4 and 6, its origin represented by a small grey spot on the costa at about one-third, and followed between veins 2 and 4 by a clear hyaline (glass-like) patch. The outer line from the costa before two-thirds, oblique outwards and ochreous as far as vein 5, then lunulate inwards and grey, parallel to the hindmargin, the lunule between veins 4 and 5 filled up with black. The submarginal line is white, lunulate-dentate and preceded and followed by ochreous-grey bands, more or less broken up into patches by the paler veins and not extending beyond vein 6, the apical area remaining pure white and the outer band shaded with brown and fulvous scales, especially between veins 6 and 3. The hindwings have an obscure curved grey cloud near the base. The centre of the wing is occupied by a hyaline space in which the silvery discocellular is conspicuous and there is a submarginal undulating white line with a grey band preceding and following it. The marginal dots are as in the forewings.
