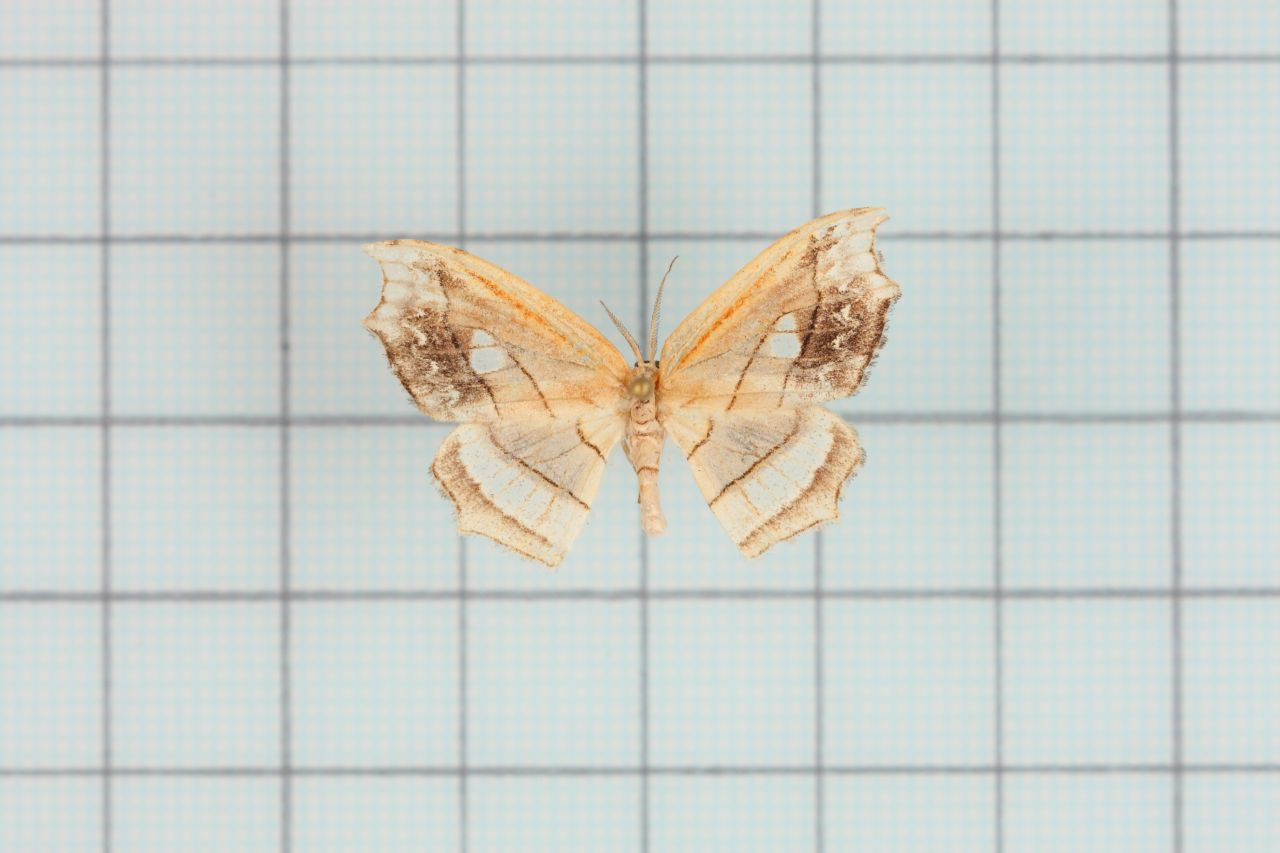
- Leucoblepsis from Taiwan identified as Leucoblepsis excisa, but probably Leucoblepsis taiwanensis

Scientific classification
- Kingdom: Animalia
- Phylum: Arthropoda
- Class: Insecta
- Order: Lepidoptera
- Family: Drepanidae
- Genus: Leucoblepsis
- Species: L. taiwanensis

Binomial name
- Leucoblepsis taiwanensis Buchsbaum & Miller, 2003

Synonyms
- Leucobrepsis taiwanensis

= Leucoblepsis taiwanensis =

Species of hook-tip moth

Leucoblepsis taiwanensis is a moth in the family Drepanidae that is endemic to Taiwan.

The wingspan is 25–32 millimetres (0.98–1.26 in). Adults have been recorded from April to December.
