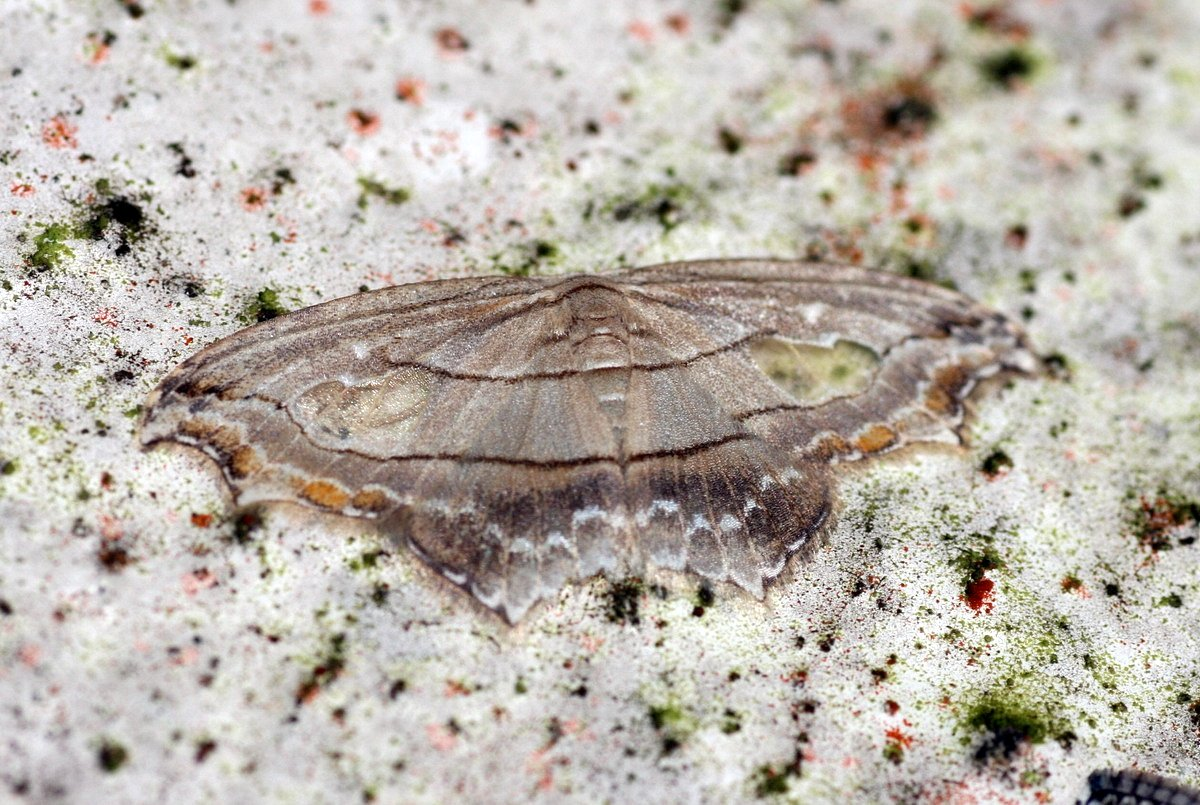

Scientific classification
- Domain: Eukaryota
- Kingdom: Animalia
- Phylum: Arthropoda
- Class: Insecta
- Order: Lepidoptera
- Family: Drepanidae
- Subfamily: Drepaninae
- Tribe: Drepanini
- Genus: Leucoblepsis; Warren in Seitz, 1922

= Leucoblepsis =

Moth genus in family Drepanidae

Leucoblepsis is a genus of moths belonging to the subfamily Drepaninae. The genus was erected by William Warren in 1922.

== Species ==
- Leucoblepsis excisa (Hampson, 1892)
- Leucoblepsis fenestraria (Moore, [1868])
- Leucoblepsis neoma (Swinhoe, 1905)
- Leucoblepsis renifera (Warren, 1900)
- Leucoblepsis taiwanensis Buchsbaum & Miller, 2003
