= Towangseong Waterfall =

Waterfall on Gangwon Province, South Korea

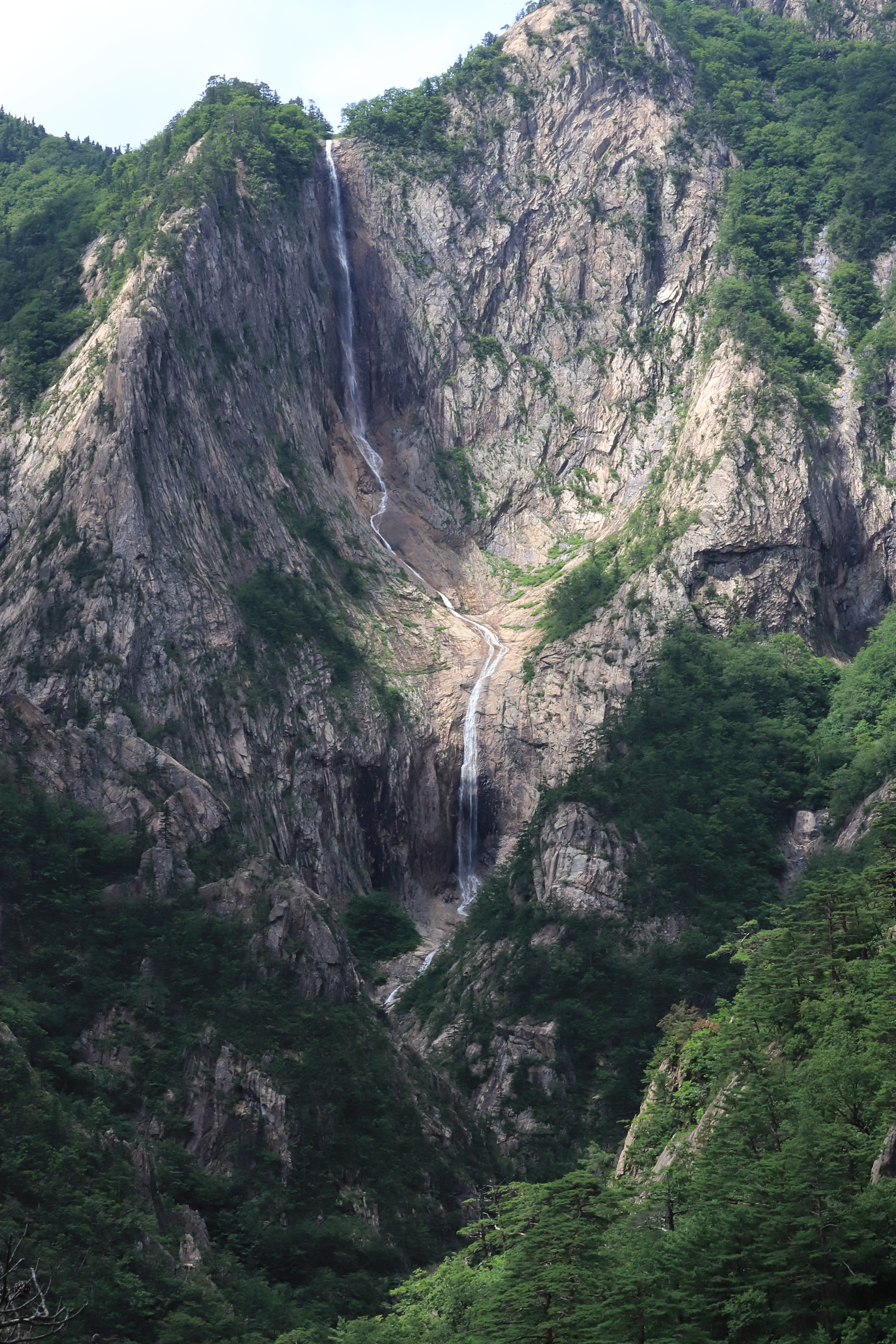
- Towangseong Waterfall in Seoraksan Mountain
- Interactive map of Towangseong Waterfall
- Location: Gangwon Province, South Korea
- Coordinates: 38°9′15.0″N 128°29′41″E
- Total height: 320 m (1,050 ft)
- Number of drops: 1

Korean name
- Hangul: 토왕성폭포
- Hanja: 土王城瀑布
- RR: Towangseong pokpo
- MR: T'owangsŏng p'okp'o

Towangseong Waterfall or Towangseongpokpo (Korean: 토왕성폭포; lit. 'hearty earth fortress waterfall') is a waterfall in Seoraksan, Sokcho, Gangwon Province, South Korea. The three-part waterfall has a top section of 150 m (492 ft), a middle section of 80 m (262 ft) and a bottom section of 90 m (295 ft). At a total combined length of 320 m (1,049 ft), it is the longest waterfall in South Korea.

The water flows from the waterfall through two more waterfalls, until it eventually joins a stream called Ssangcheon (쌍천; 雙川).

An alternate name for the waterfall is Singwangpokpo (신광폭포; 神光瀑布). The "Towang" portion of the waterfall's name, meaning "hearty earth", comes from a belief that rock formations such as the ones found at the waterfall are only possible when there is much earth energy (as in the traditional five elements).

== See also ==
- List of waterfalls
- List of waterfalls in South Korea
