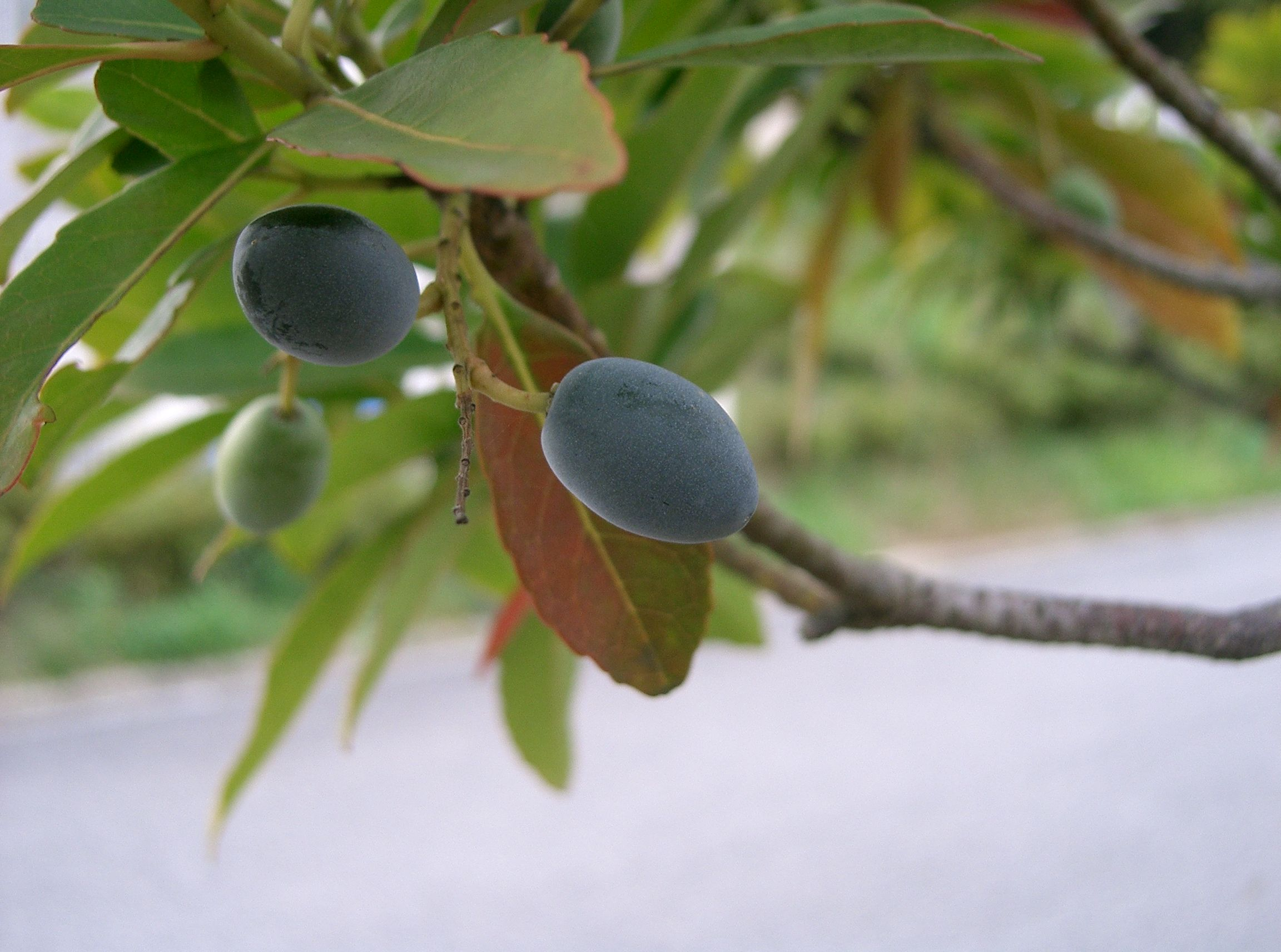
- Elaeocarpus sylvestris, branch with fruits

Conservation status
- Least Concern (IUCN 3.1)

Scientific classification
- Kingdom: Plantae
- Clade: Tracheophytes
- Clade: Angiosperms
- Clade: Eudicots
- Clade: Rosids
- Order: Oxalidales
- Family: Elaeocarpaceae
- Genus: Elaeocarpus
- Species: E. sylvestris

Binomial name
- Elaeocarpus sylvestris (Lour.) Poir. 1811

Subspecies
- Elaeocarpus sylvestris var. argenteus (Merr.) Y.C. Liu Lign. Pl. Taiwan 375 1972; Elaeocarpus sylvestris var. ellipticus H. Hara Japanese: Horutonoki (ja); Elaeocarpus sylvestris var. hayatae (Kaneh. & Sasaki) Y.C. Liu; Elaeocarpus sylvestris var. lanyuensis (C.E. Chang) C.E. Chang Fl. Taiwan (ed. 2) 3: 720 1993; Elaeocarpus sylvestris var. pachycarpus (Koidz.) H. Ohba J. Jap. Bot. 64: 328 1989; Elaeocarpus sylvestris var. viridescens Chun & F.C. How Acta Phytotax. Sin. 7(1): 12 1958

Synonyms
- Adenodus sylvestris Lour.; Elaeocarpus henryi Hance; Elaeocarpus kwangtungensis Hu; Elaeocarpus omeiensis Rehder & E.H.Wilson

= Elaeocarpus sylvestris =

Species of tree found in East Asia

Elaeocarpus sylvestris, the woodland elaeocarpus, is a species of flowering plant in the family Elaeocarpaceae.

== Distribution ==
The woodland elaeocarpus is native to South-Central and Southeast China, Hainan, and Vietnam.

== Description ==
The tree grows up to 15 m (49 ft) and is found in evergreen forests at altitudes comprised between 300 and 2,000 m (980 and 6,560 ft). The evergreen shiny leaves are oblanceolate. The greeny-white flowers are grouped in racemes and are followed by black olive-like fruit in autumn.

== Uses ==
The fruits of the woodland elaeocarpus are edible. The oil from the seeds may be processed into soap or lubricants. The bark may be used as a source for dye. The wood does not resist water, so it is not considered good timber, but it is used for growing shiitake mushrooms.

It is also used for planting along streets and in parks.

== Ecology ==
The larvae of the moth Leucoblepsis excisa feed on the leaves of E. sylvestris. In urban forests of Kamakura, Kanagawa, Japan, the Formosan squirrel (Callosciurus erythraeus taiwanensis) is a pest to the tree because of its gnawing habit.

Woodland elaeocarpus in susceptible to Elaeocarpus yellows, a disease discovered in 1999 and a type of Phytoplasma disease, which causes a chlorosis (Japanese: 萎黄病 iō-byō) of the plant. Oxytetracycline has been used to fight the pathogen.

== Chemistry ==
This species contains the gallotannin 1,2,3,4,6-penta-O-galloyl-beta-D-glucose, a compound that may be used in radioprotection. It also contains elaeocarpusin, a molecule with a unique acid ester group probably derived by a condensation of a hexahydroxydiphenoyl group and dehydroascorbic acid attached to the 2,4-positions of 1-O-galloyl- 3,6-(R)-hexahydroxydiphenoyl-D-glucopyranose (corilagin).

== Symbolism ==
The horutonoki (Elaeocarpus sylvestris var. ellipticus) is the tree symbol of Japanese city Urasoe, Okinawa. Wild Dampalsu trees (Elaeocarpus sylvestris var. ellipticus) in Cheonjiyeon Waterfall are South Korean Natural Monument no. 163.

== Gallery ==
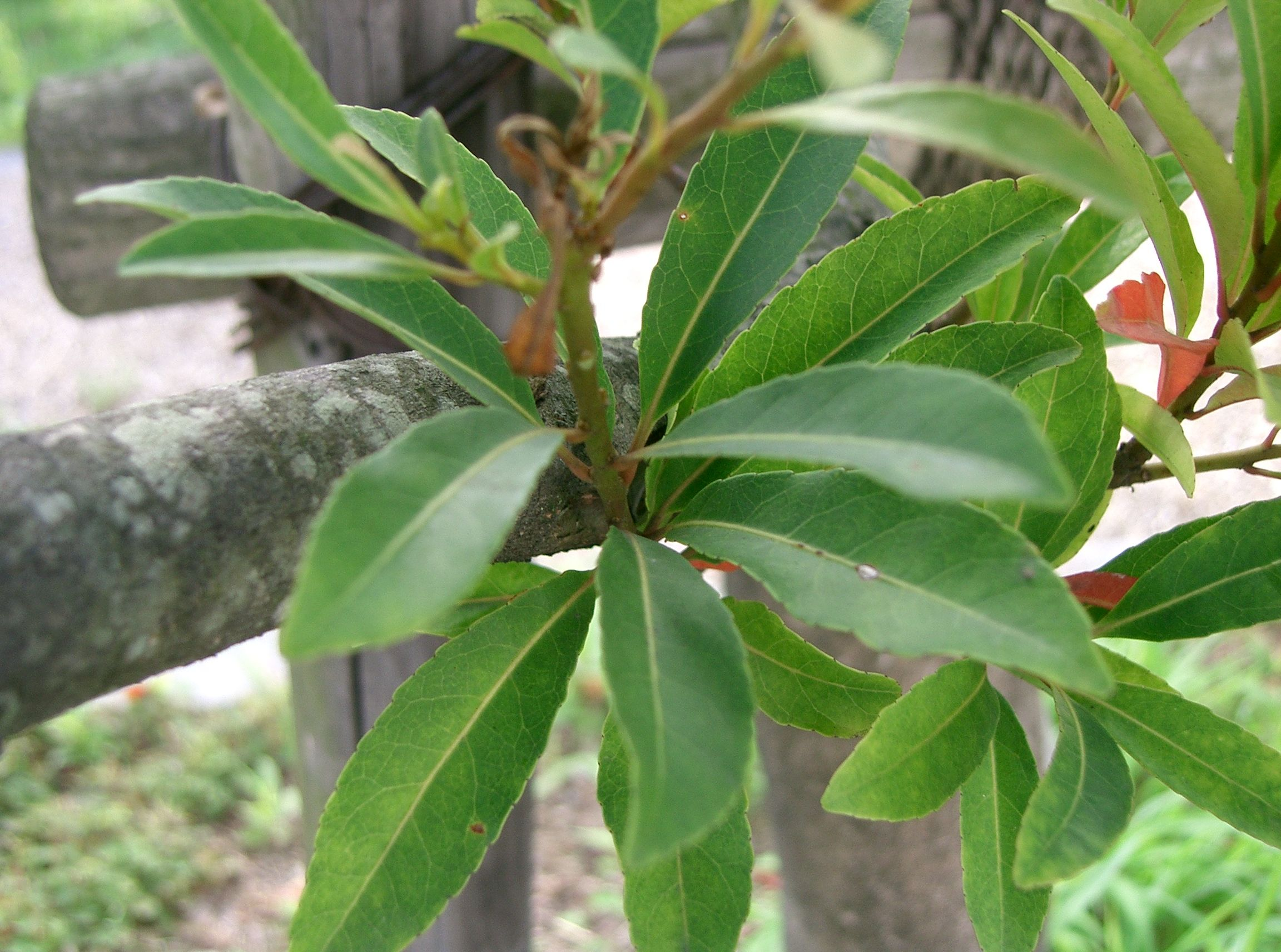
var. ellipticus

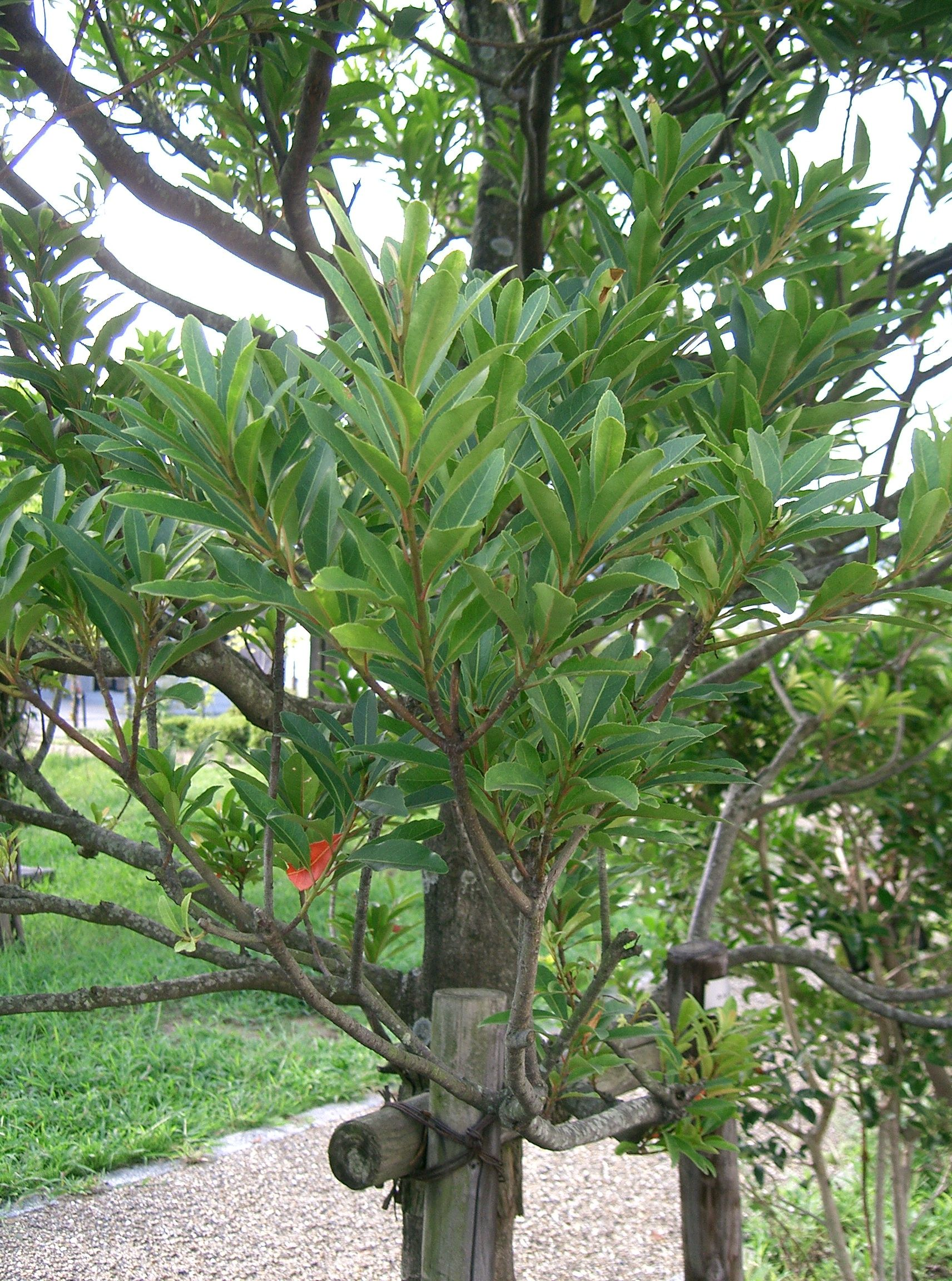
var. ellipticus

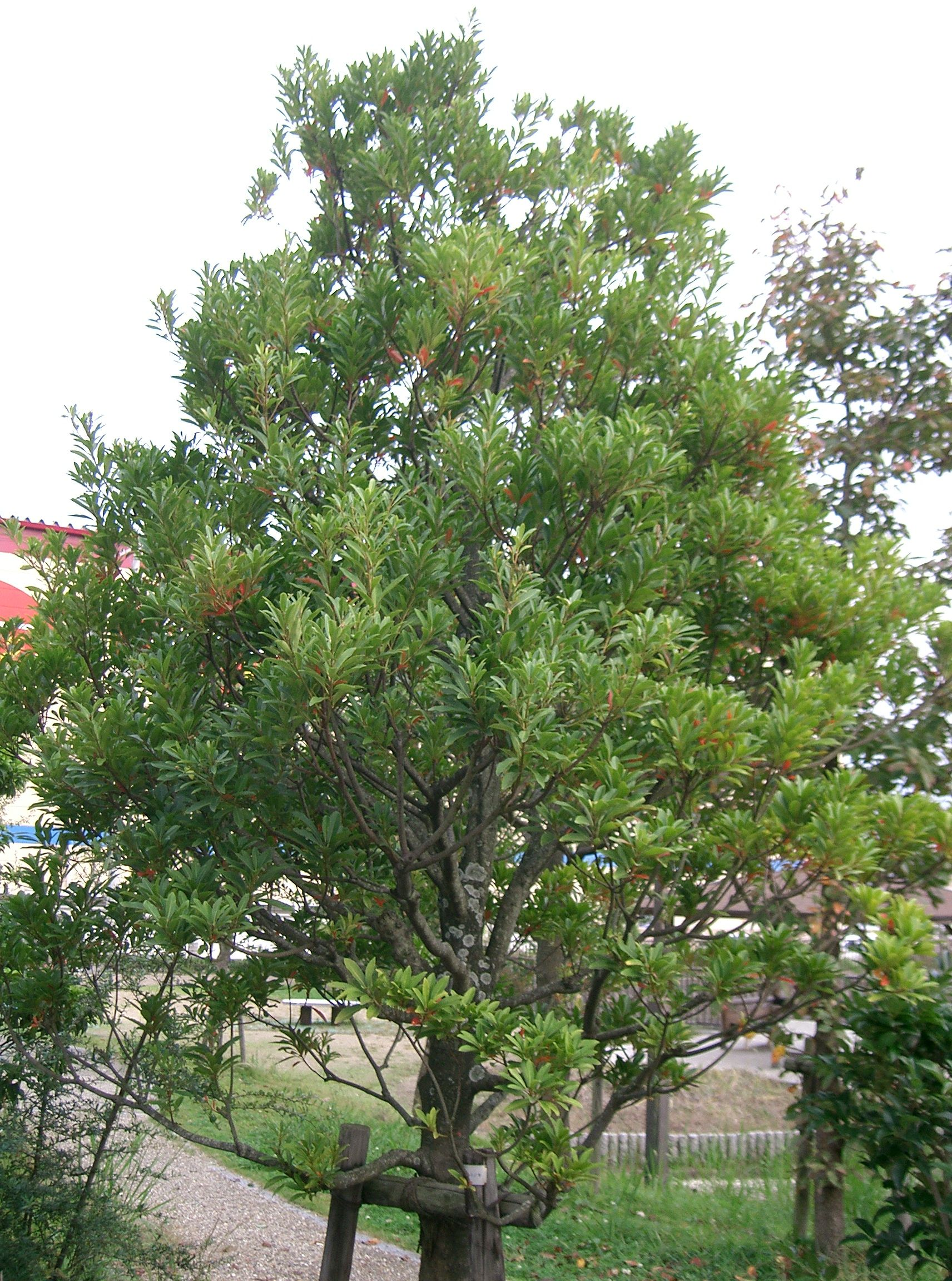
var. ellipticus

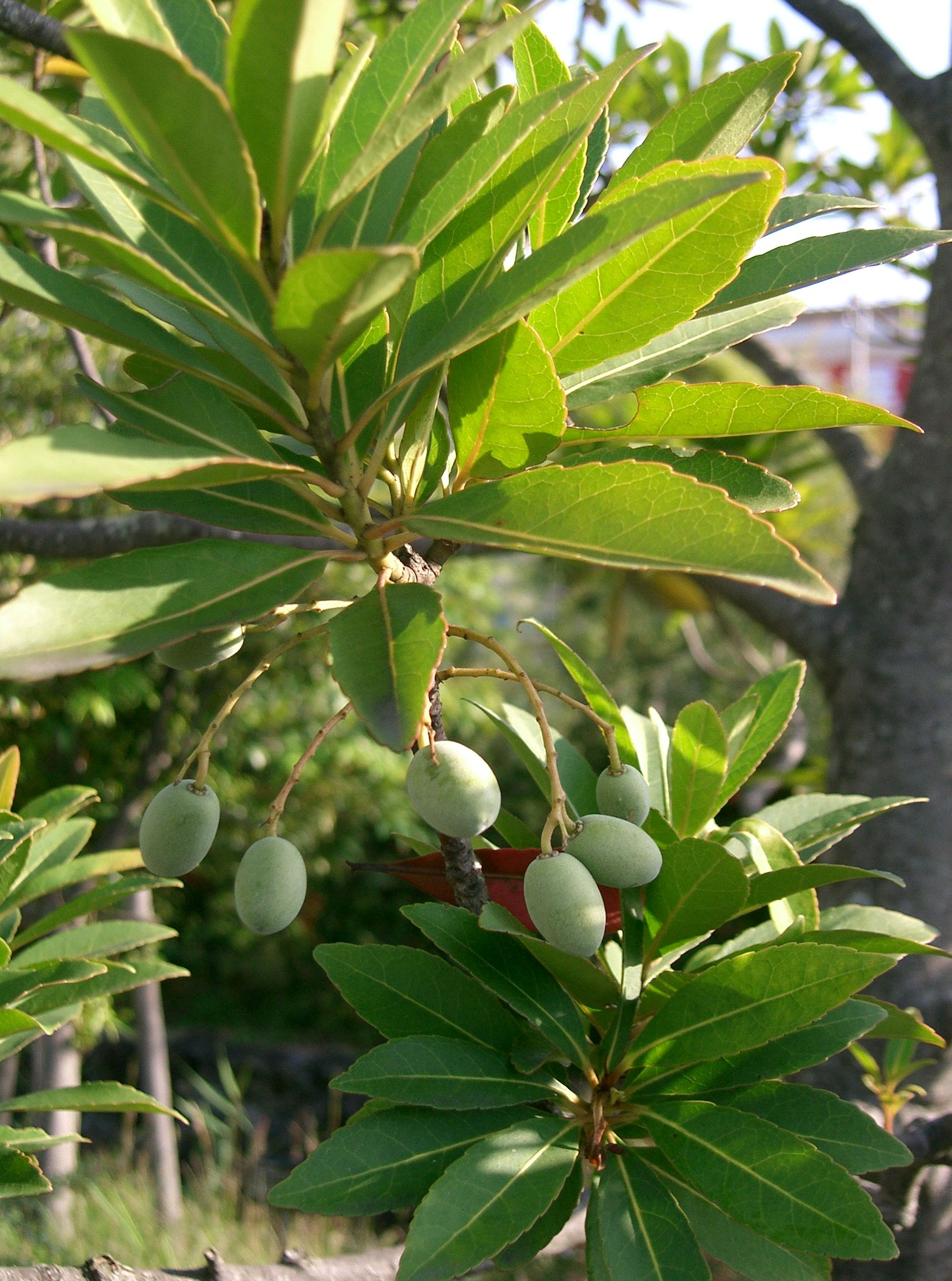
var. ellipticus

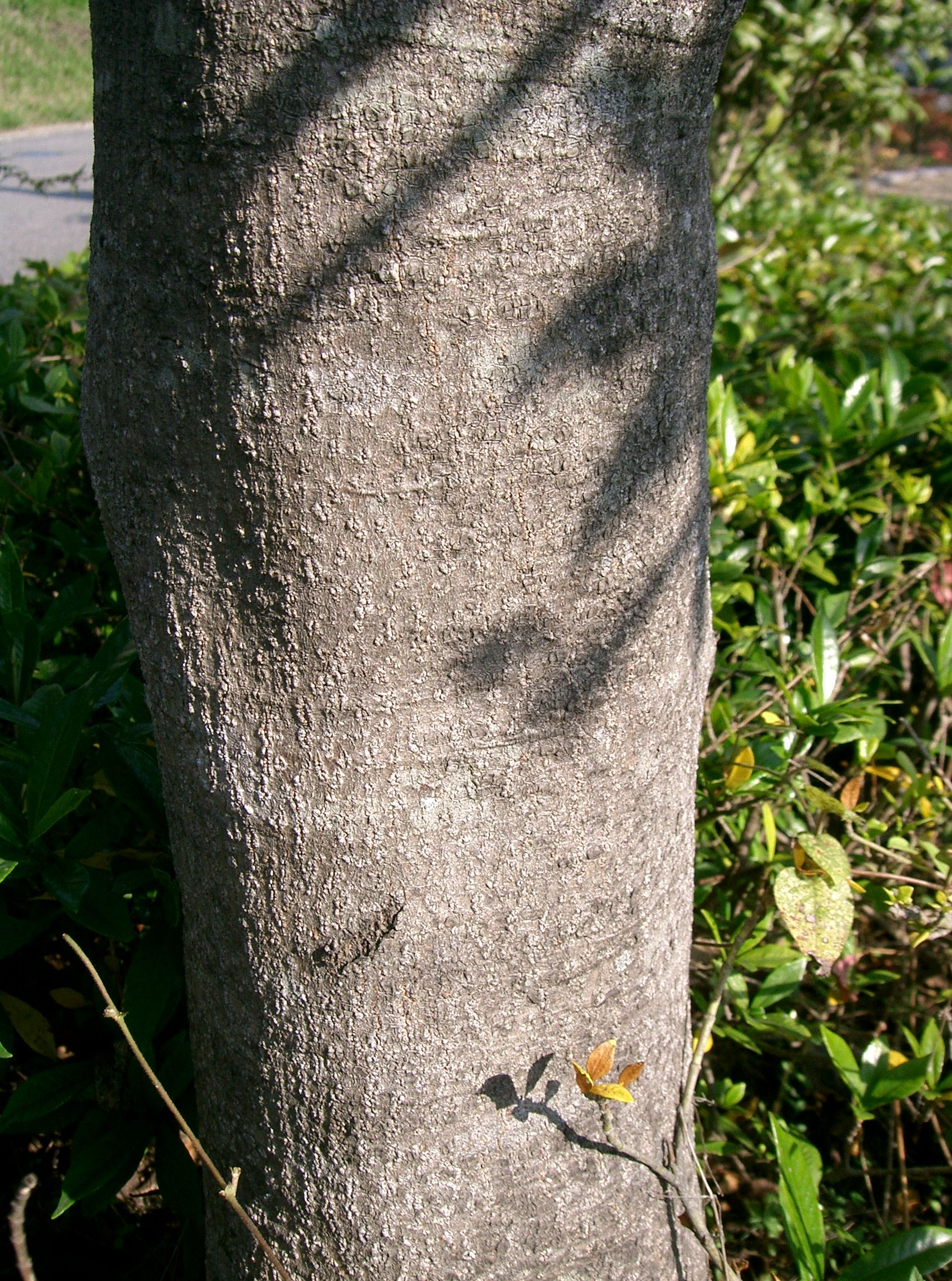
var. ellipticus

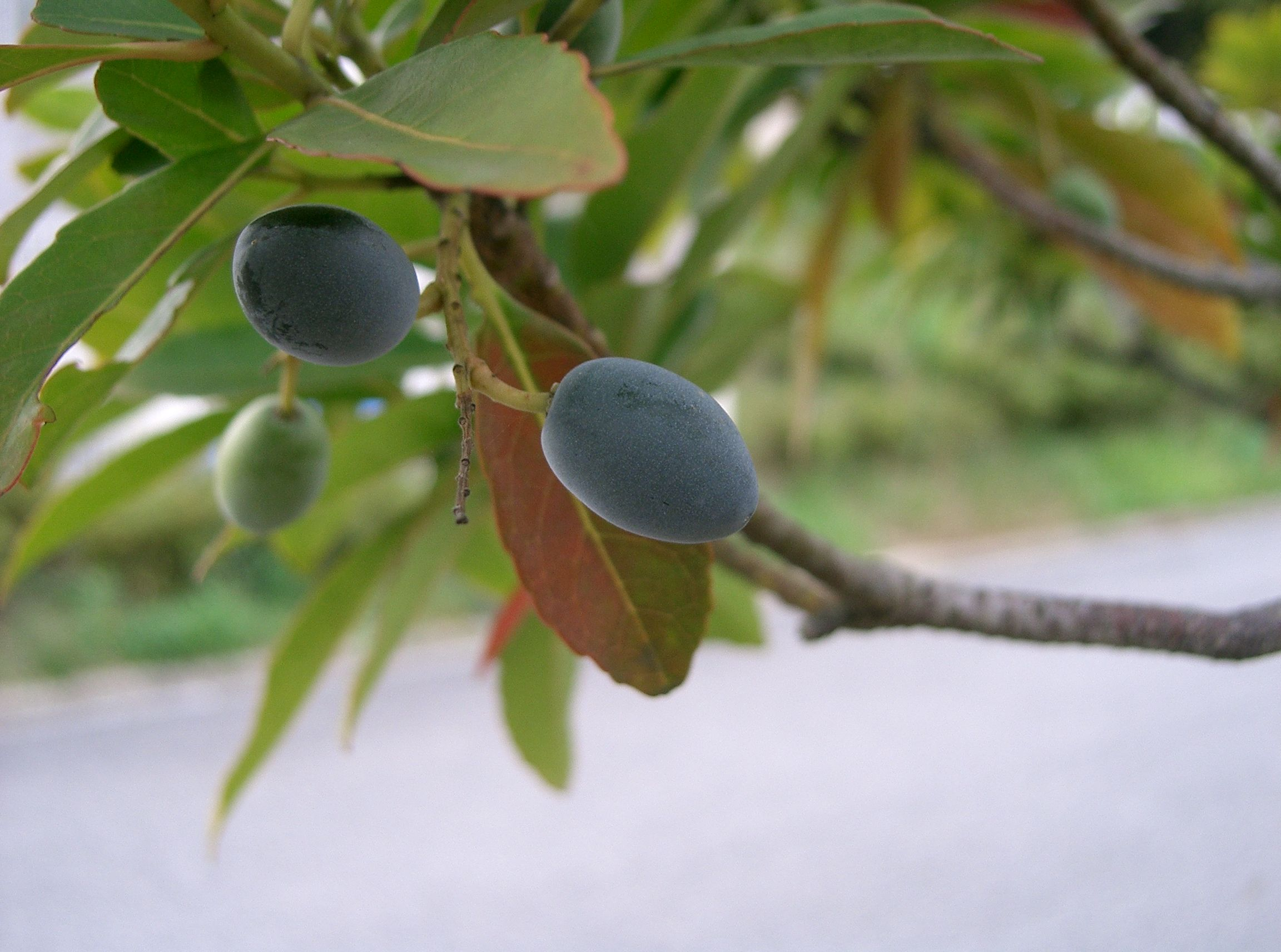
var. ellipticus

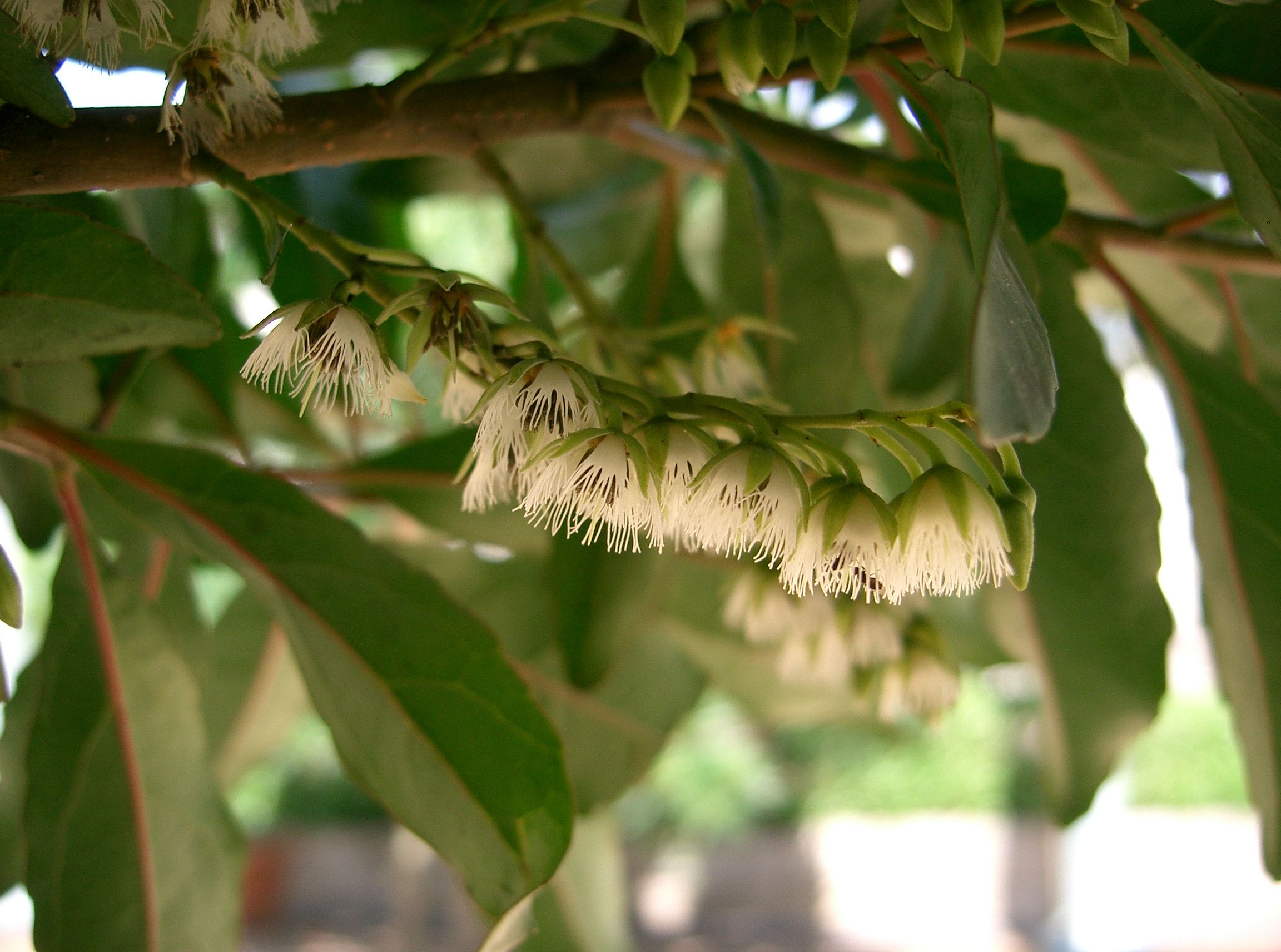
var. ellipticus

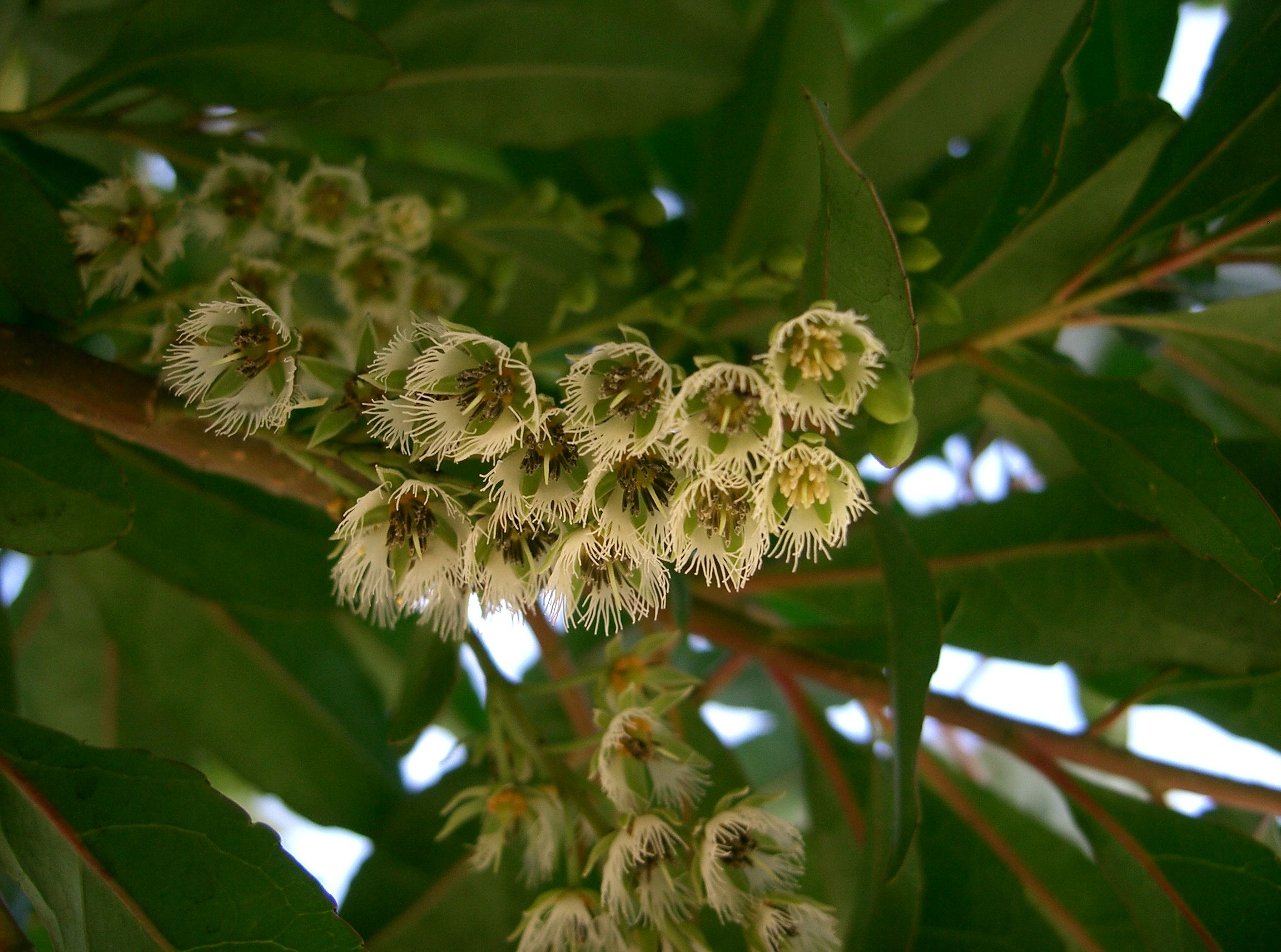
var. ellipticus

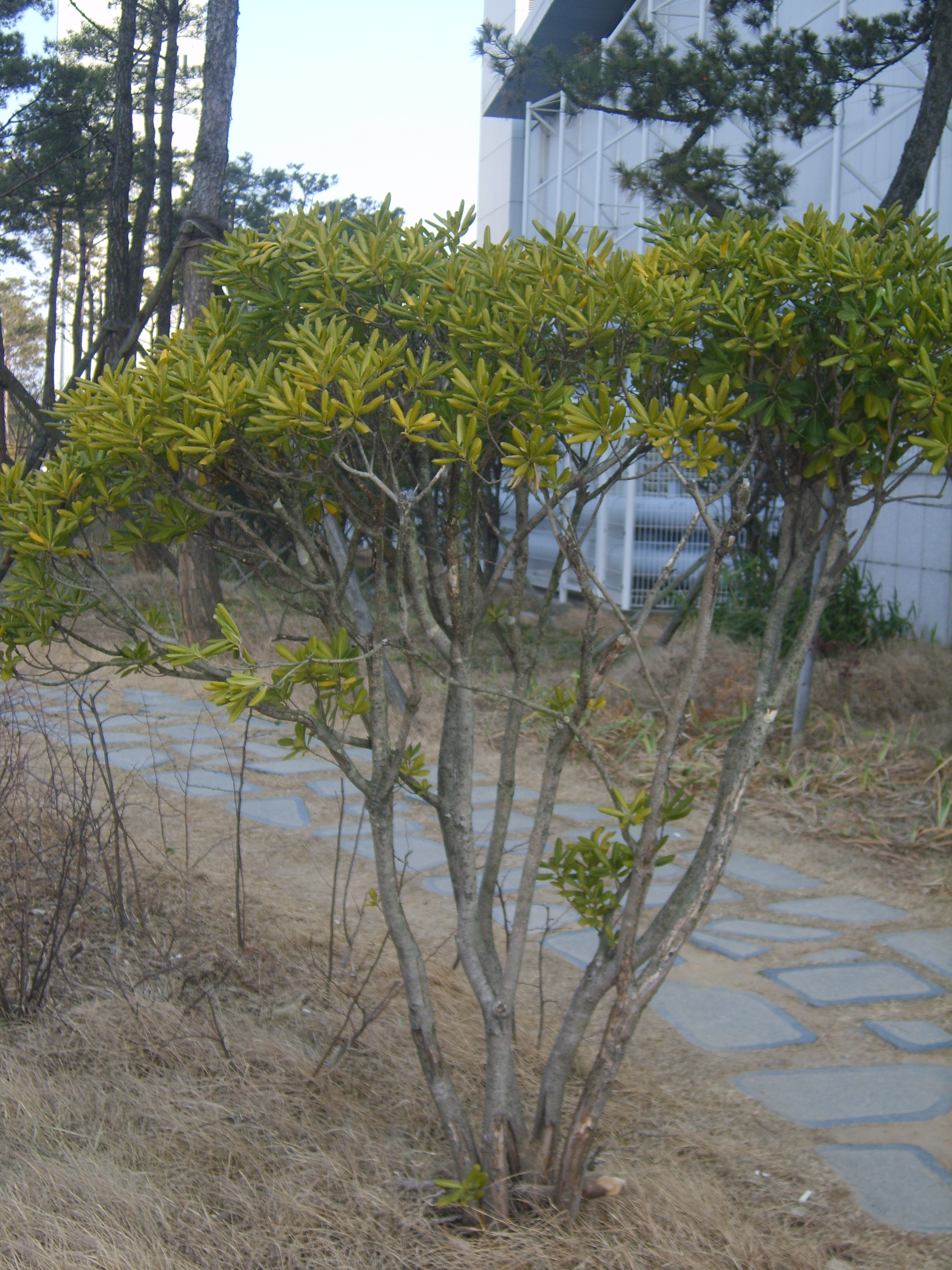
var. ellipticus.

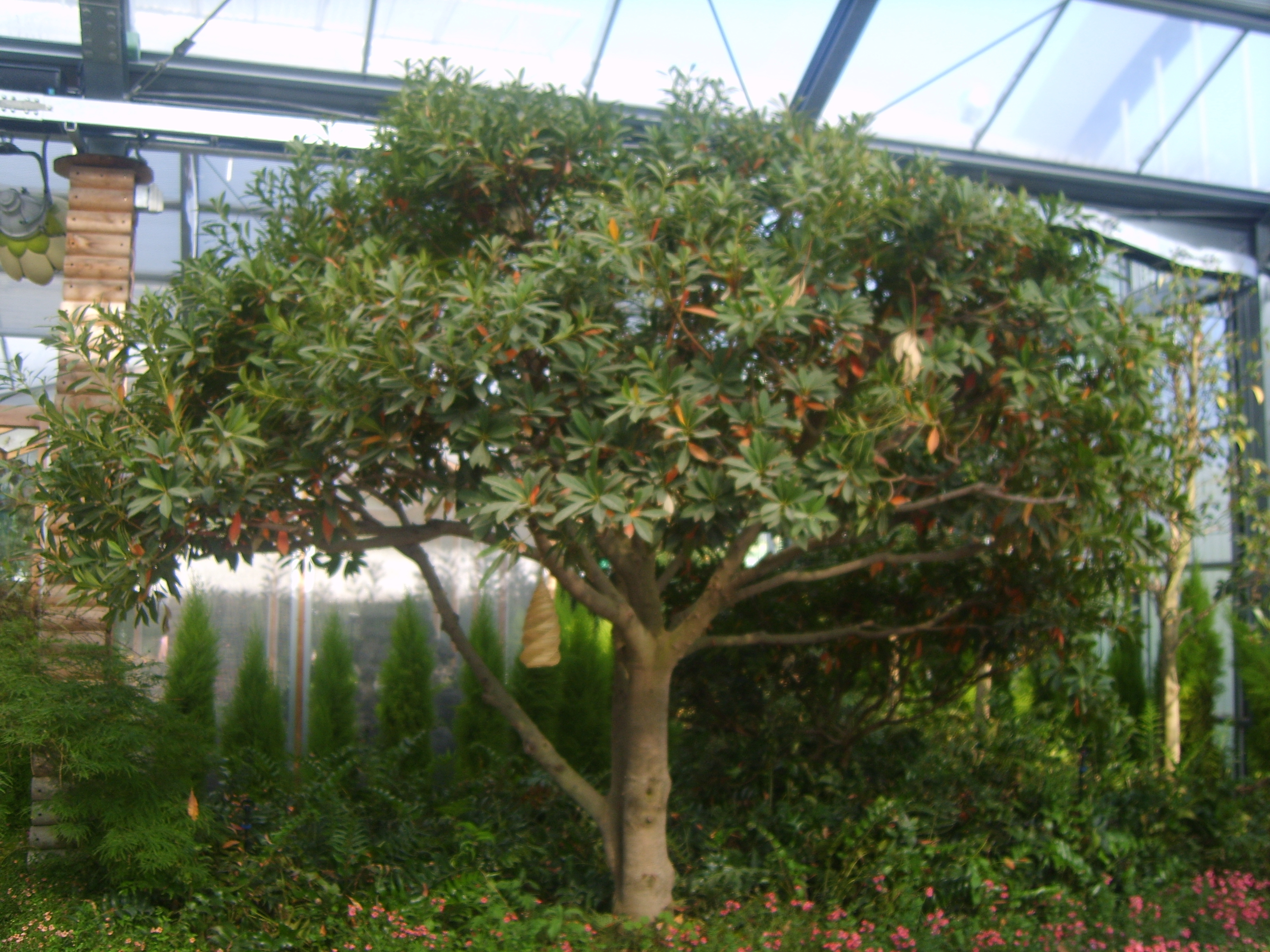
var. ellipticus. Hampyung, Korea

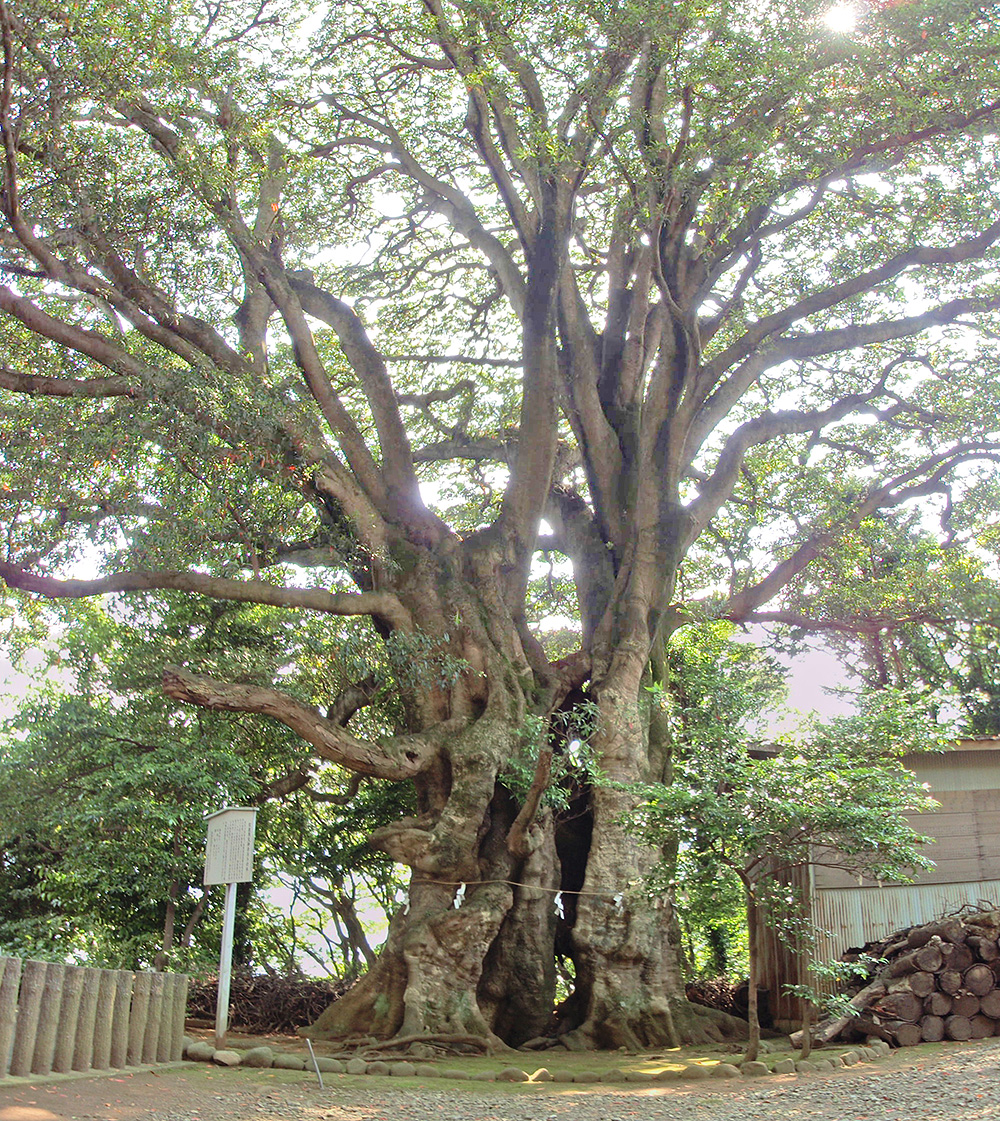
This big Elaeocarpus sylvestris tree is located in Hihayo Tenjin Shrine, Ito city, Shizuoka Prefecture, Japan. It is Japan's biggest Elaeocarpus sylvestris.
