= Lingelsheimia sylvestris =

Conservation status
- Critically Endangered (IUCN 3.1)

Scientific classification
- Kingdom: Plantae
- Clade: Tracheophytes
- Clade: Angiosperms
- Clade: Eudicots
- Clade: Rosids
- Order: Malpighiales
- Family: Phyllanthaceae
- Genus: Lingelsheimia
- Species: L. sylvestris

Binomial name
- Lingelsheimia sylvestris (Radcl.-Sm.) Radcl.-Sm

Synonyms
- Aerisilvaea sylvestris A.Radcliffe-smith

Species of flowering plant

Lingelsheimia sylvestris is a species of plant in the family Phyllanthaceae. It is endemic to Tanzania. It is confined to a forest reserve surrounded by intense development.
