= List of beaches in South Korea =

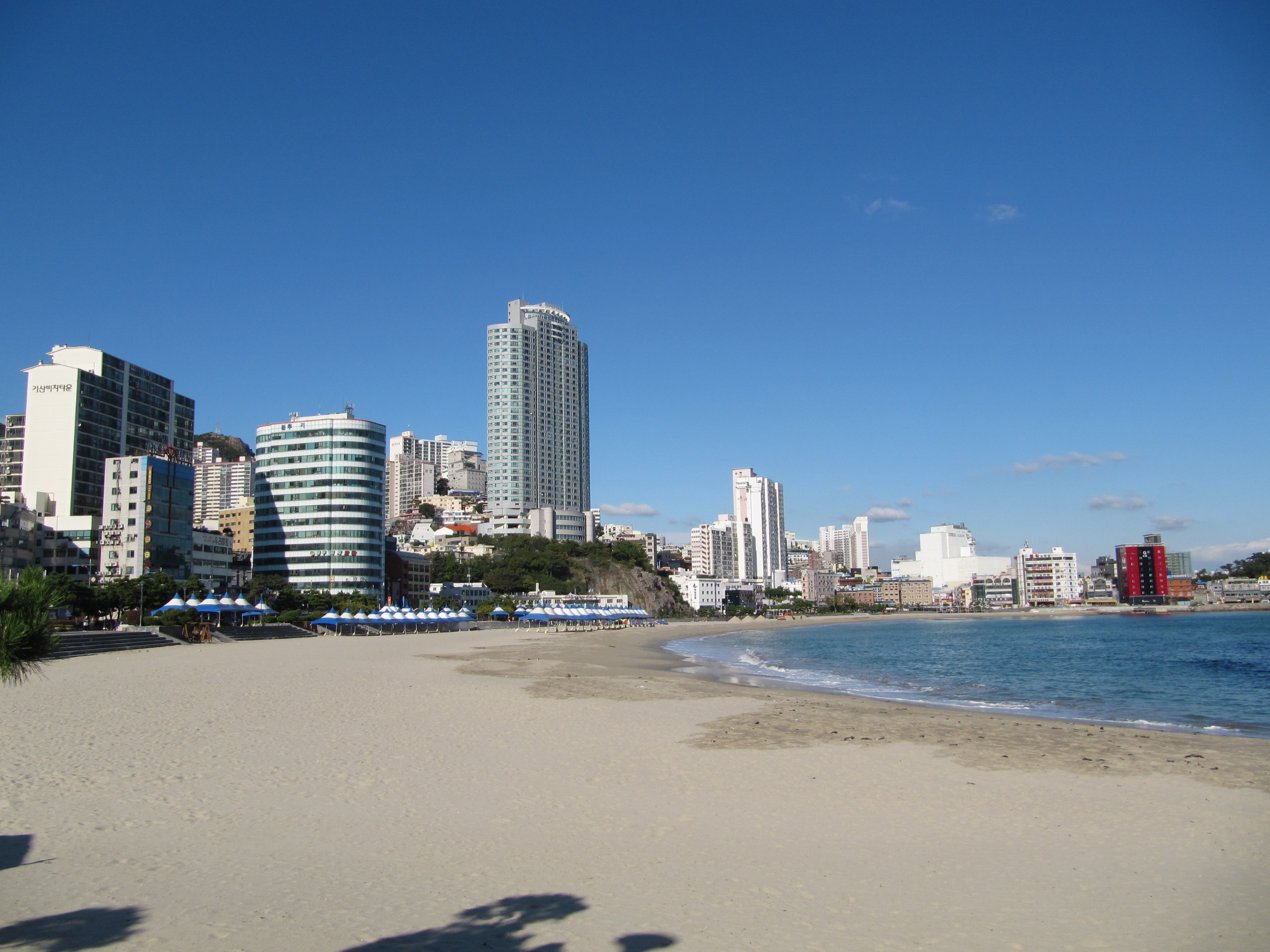
Songdo Beach in Busan

This is a list of beaches in South Korea. The first beach of South Korea is Songdo Beach in Busan. There are 330 beaches nationwide with 94 in Gangwon Province, 66 in South Jeolla Province, 51 in South Chungcheong Province and 9 in North Jeolla Province.

== Busan ==
- Haeundae Beach
- Gwangalli Beach
- Songdo Beach

== South Chungcheong ==
=== Boryeong ===
- Daecheon Beach

== Gangwon ==
=== Sokcho ===
- Sokcho Beach

=== Yangyang ===
- Naksan Beach

== Incheon ==
- Hanagae Beach

== Jeju ==
- Hyeopjae Beach

== External link ==
- Media related to Beaches of South Korea at Wikimedia Commons
