= List of beaches in Jeju Province =

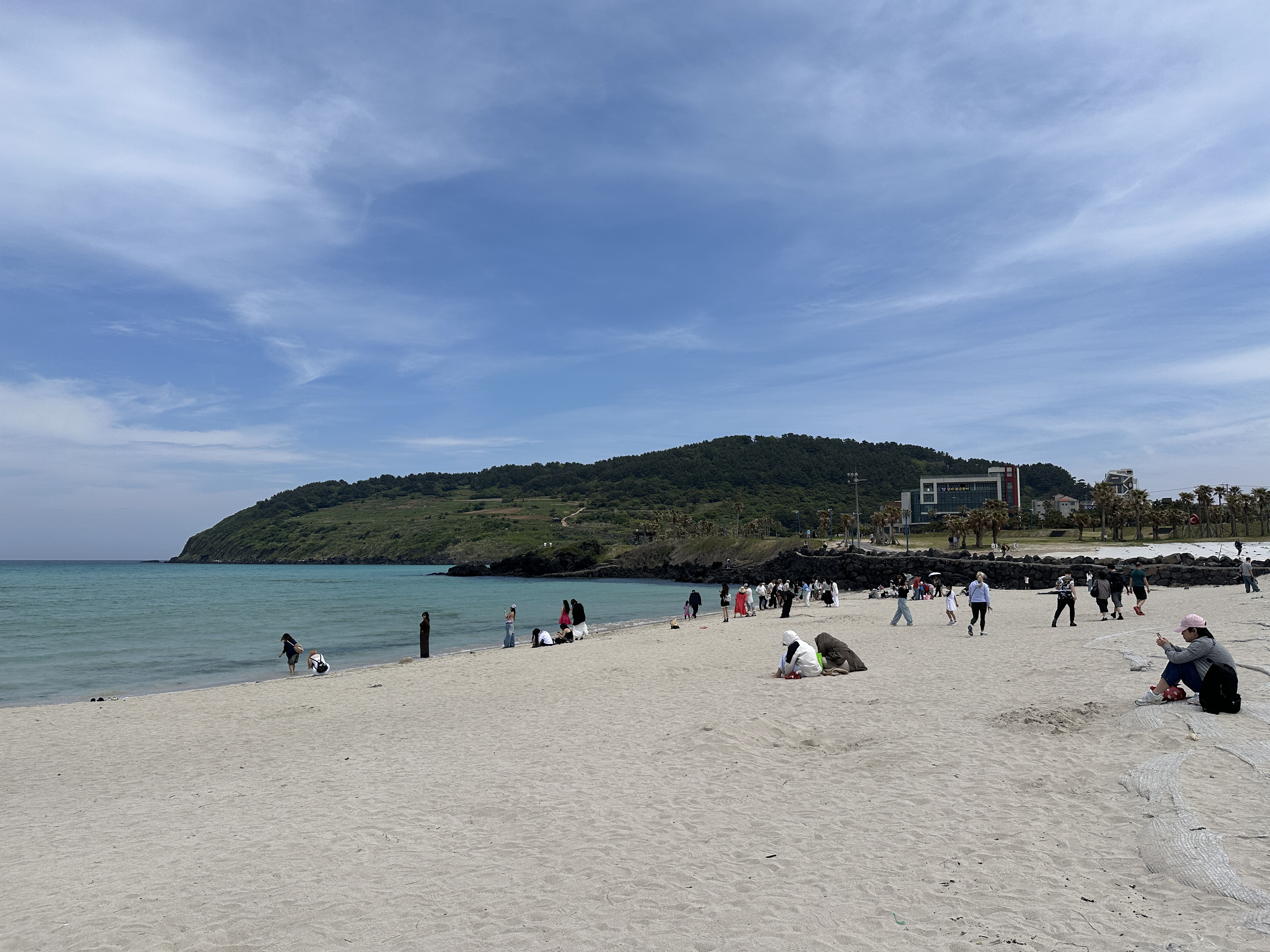
Hamdeok Beach, the most popular beach in Jeju Province

There are a number of beaches designated for recreational use in Jeju Province, South Korea.

== List ==
- Geommeolle Beach
- Geumneung Beach
- Gimnyeong Beach
- Gwakji Beach
- Gwangchigi Beach
- Hado Beach
- Hagosudong Beach
- Hamdeok Beach
- Handam Beach
- Hyeopjae Beach
- Hwasun Golden Sand Beach
- Iho Tewoo Beach
- Jungmun Saekdal Beach
- Pyoseon Beach
- Samyang Beach
- Sagye Beach
- Sehwa Beach
- Soesokkak Estuary Beach
- Sinyang Seopji Beach
- Woljeong-ri Beach

=== Other ===
- Hamo Beach (also called Daejeong Beach; swimming not available for safety reasons, camping and hiking available)
- Udo Sanho Beach (on the island Udo; also called Seobinbaeksa)

== See also ==
- List of beaches in South Korea
