= Jeju Queer Culture Festival =

Korean LGBT festival

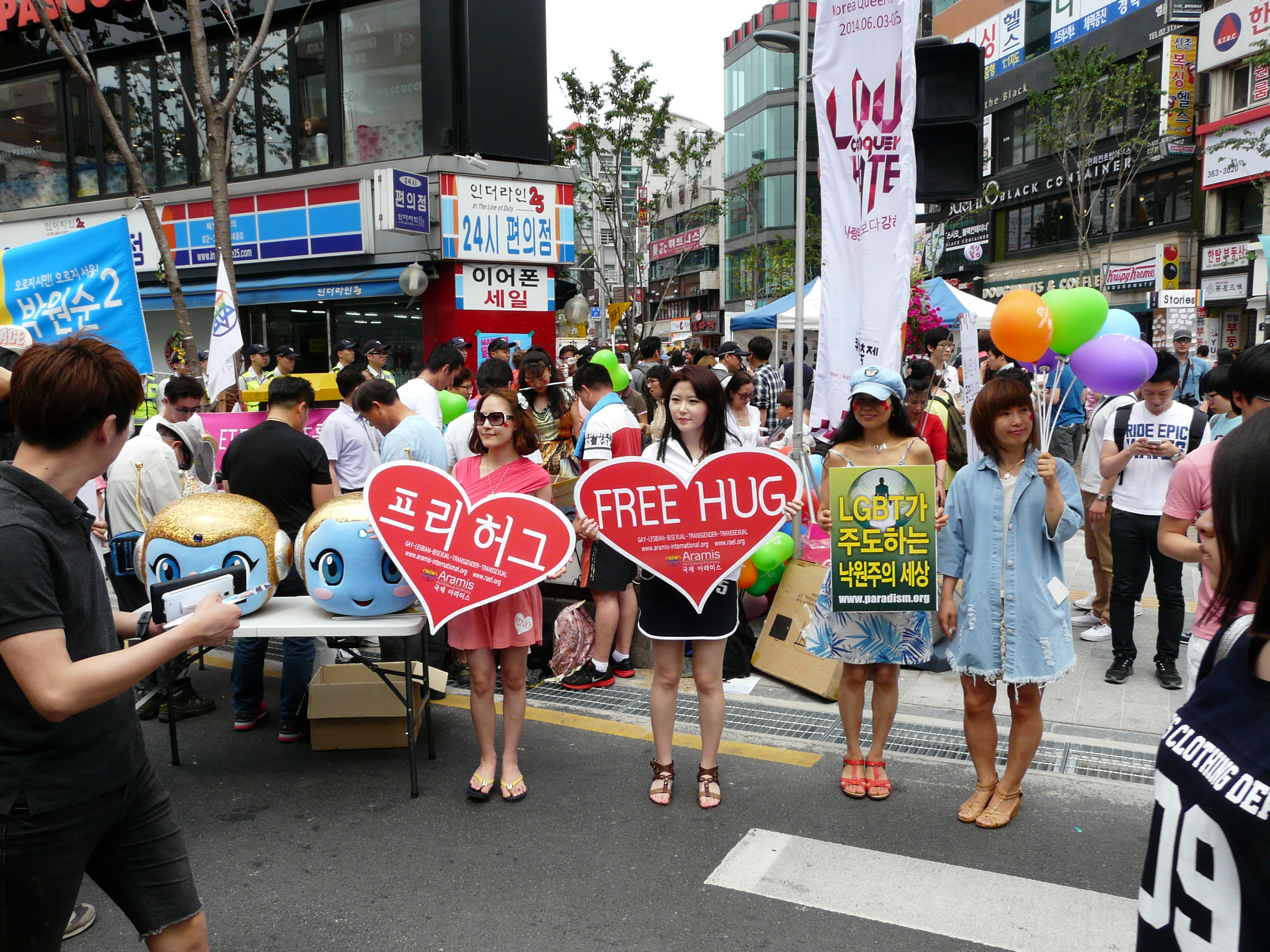
- Korea Queer Culture Festival 2014

Korean name
- Hangul: 제주퀴어문화축제
- Hanja: 濟州퀴어文化祝祭
- RR: Jeju kwieo munhwa chukje
- MR: Cheju k'wiŏ munhwa ch'ukche

The Jeju Queen Culture Festival (Korean: 제주퀴어문화축제) is an annual LGBTQ festival held in Jeju City, Jeju Province, South Korea since 2017. The festival aims to increase the visibility of the LGBTQ community in Jeju and spread messages of solidarity and inclusion in the face of discrimination and prejudice. It features a range of events, including parades, cultural performances, exhibitions, and lectures, and serves as a platform for both LGBTQ individuals and allies to come together and raise awareness about human rights. Despite facing continued opposition from conservative religious groups and other detractors, the festival has persisted each year and has become an important opportunity to spark dialogue on diversity and social acceptance in the Jeju region.

It was Jeju's first LGBTQ human rights festival.

== History ==
=== Background ===
On May 25, 2017, hate speech was rampant online due to the initiative of Representative Kim Jong-dae of the Justice Party, and civil society activists and political party activists in Jeju Island resolved that queers need to be visualized in Jeju. On June 10, 2017, the first Jeju Queer Culture Festival preparation meeting was held. After that, it was renamed the Jeju Queer Culture Festival Organizing Committee, elected the chairman of the organizing committee, and declared the Jeju Queer Culture Festival through a press conference.

The Jeju Queer Culture Festival Organizing Committee decided Hamdeok Beach as the venue for the festival, but failed due to opposition from the village. At the same time, banners opposing the holding of the Jeju Queer Culture Festival were posted across Jeju. LGBTQ hate groups, centering on a church in Jeju, tried to defeat the Jeju Queer Culture Festival. The Jeju Queer Culture Festival Organizing Committee selected Sinsan Park as an alternative and completed the assembly report. However, on October 18, 2017, the Jeju City Hall Civil Service Review Committee did not allow the use of the place due to complaints from LGBTQ hate groups. On October 19, 2017, the Jeju Queer Culture Festival Organizing Committee filed a lawsuit for revocation of the permission to use the place and a provisional injunction with the court, and finally, the Jeju Queer Culture Festival could be held in Sinsan Park.

=== 1st Jeju Queer Culture Festival ===
The first Jeju Queer Culture Festival was held at Sinsan Park in Jeju City on October 28, 2017 with the slogan <퀴어 옵써예> It attracted 1,000 participants. After the first Jeju Queer Culture Festival, the Jeju Queer Culture Festival Organizing Committee decided to launch the second period with the dissolution and held a human rights meeting.

=== 2nd Jeju Queer Culture Festival ===
The second Jeju Queer Culture Festival was held at Sinsan Park in Jeju City on September 29, 2018, under the slogan <탐라는 퀴어> Programs such as 'Jang Quizarang', where participants perform in person, and 'the Circle of Peace Dance Workshop' with participants were held. The 2nd Jeju Queer Culture Festival, Record of the Day [2018 Jeju Queer].

=== Name change and organizational estructuring ===
In 2023, the organizing committee of the Jeju Queer Culture Festival officially changed the name of the group and the festival to “Jeju Queer Pride (JQP).” This change was made to clarify the festival's identity and to actively express the meaning of queer pride within the local community. The festival's direction and activities were diversified accordingly, and since then, events and community programs have been held under the name “JQP.”

=== 2024 Jeju Queer Pride ===
The 2024 Jeju Queer Pride was held on July 13 at the Jagu-ri Cultural Arts Park in Seogwipo under the slogan <다함께 퀴어로 빛나는 제주>

== Event ==
The Jeju Queer Culture Festival features booth events, performances, and parades.
