= Sagye Beach =

Beach in Seogwipo, South Korea

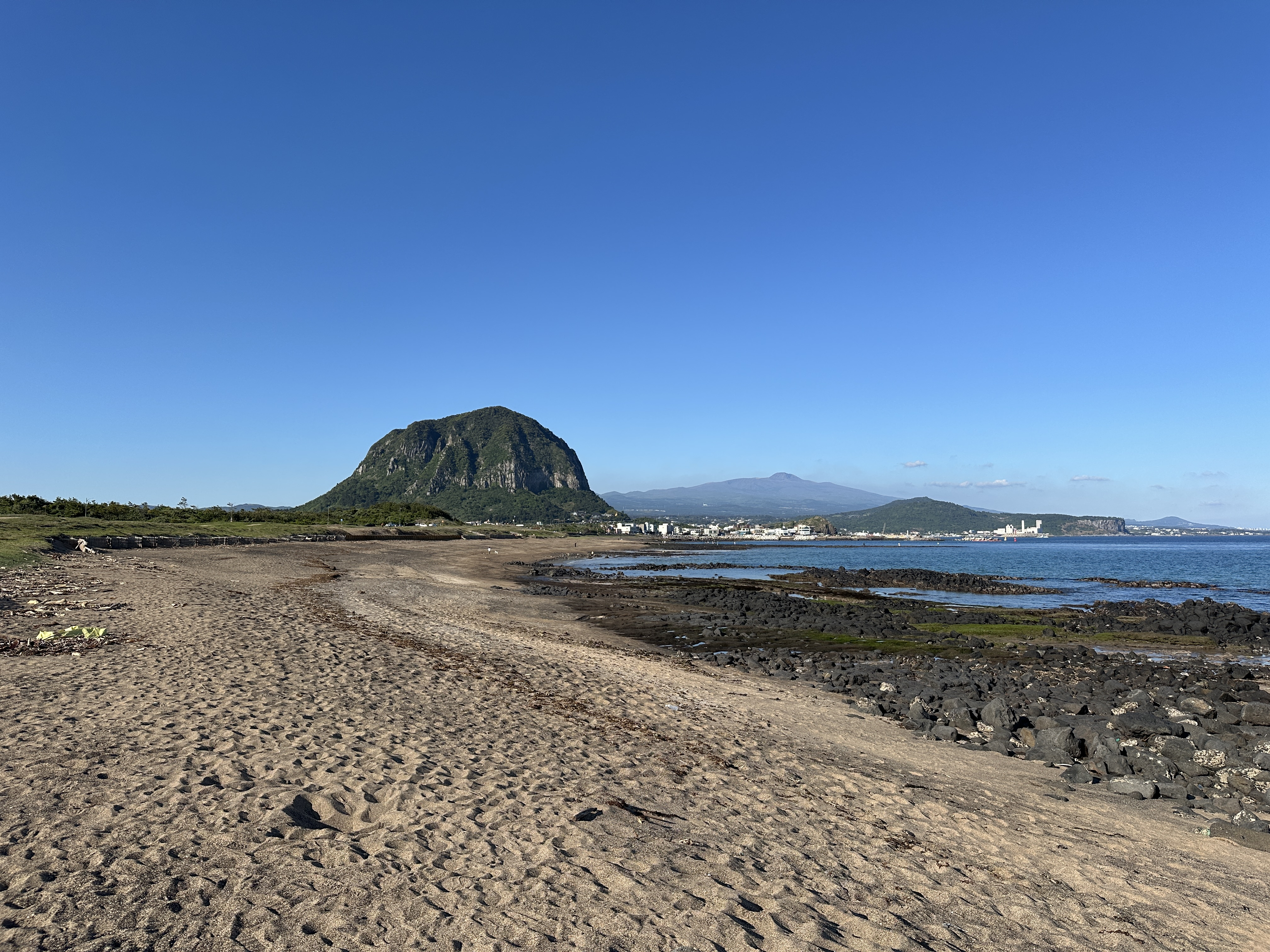
- The beach, with Sanbangsan in the distance (2026)
- Interactive map of Sagye Beach
- Coordinates: 33.2246°N 126.2993°E
- Location: Seogwipo, Jeju Province, South Korea

Korean name
- Hangul: 사계해변
- Hanja: 沙溪海邊
- RR: Sagye haebyeon
- MR: Sagye haebyŏn

Sagye Beach (Korean: 사계해변) is a beach in Andeok-myeon, Seogwipo, Jeju Province, South Korea. It is the southernmost beach in the country.

The characters of the beach's name respectively mean "sand" and "stream".

The beach is around 1 km long and has much black volcanic sand. It has many volcanic rock formations. The beach has a clear view of the island Hyeongjeseom and the mountains Sanbangsan and Songaksan. It is also part of the Jeju Olle Trail. The beach is experiencing gradual coastal erosion.

The beach has held various events. In 2025, a drone fishing event was held.

== Gallery ==
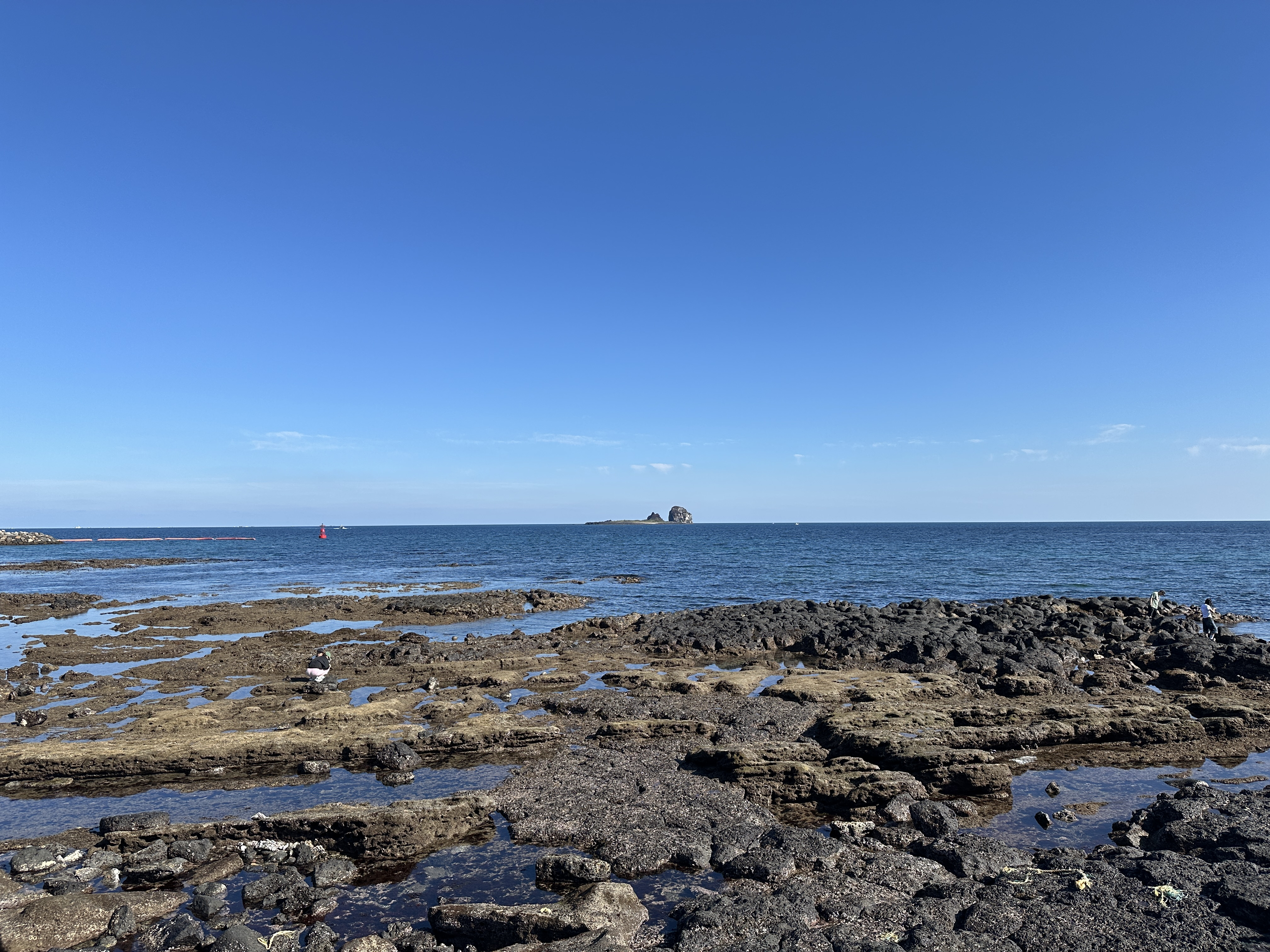
Volcanic rock formations and Hyeongjeseom in the distance (2026)

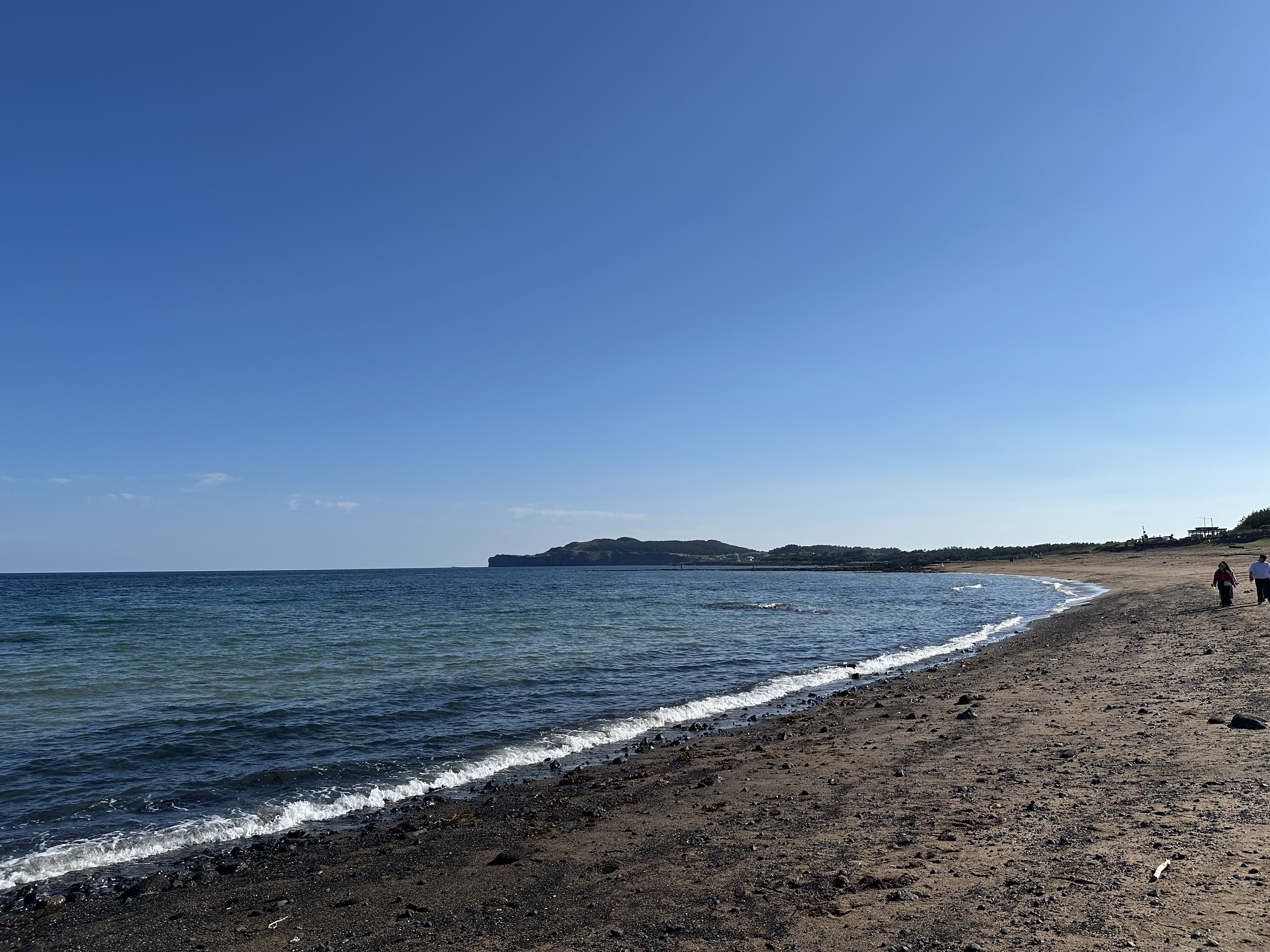
Viewing west (2026)

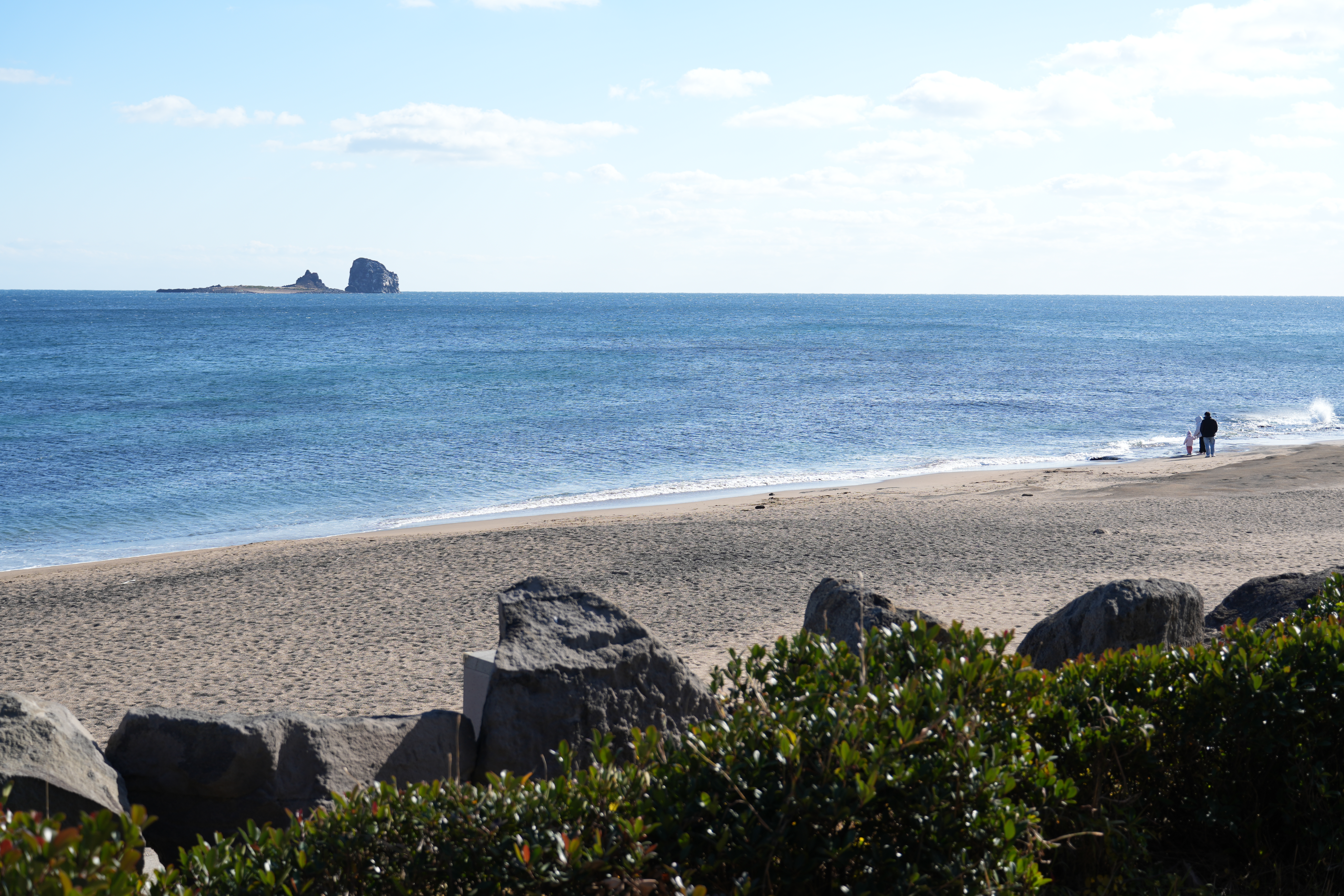
View from the north (2025)

== See also ==
- List of beaches in Jeju Province
