= Samyang Beach =

Beach in Jeju City, South Korea

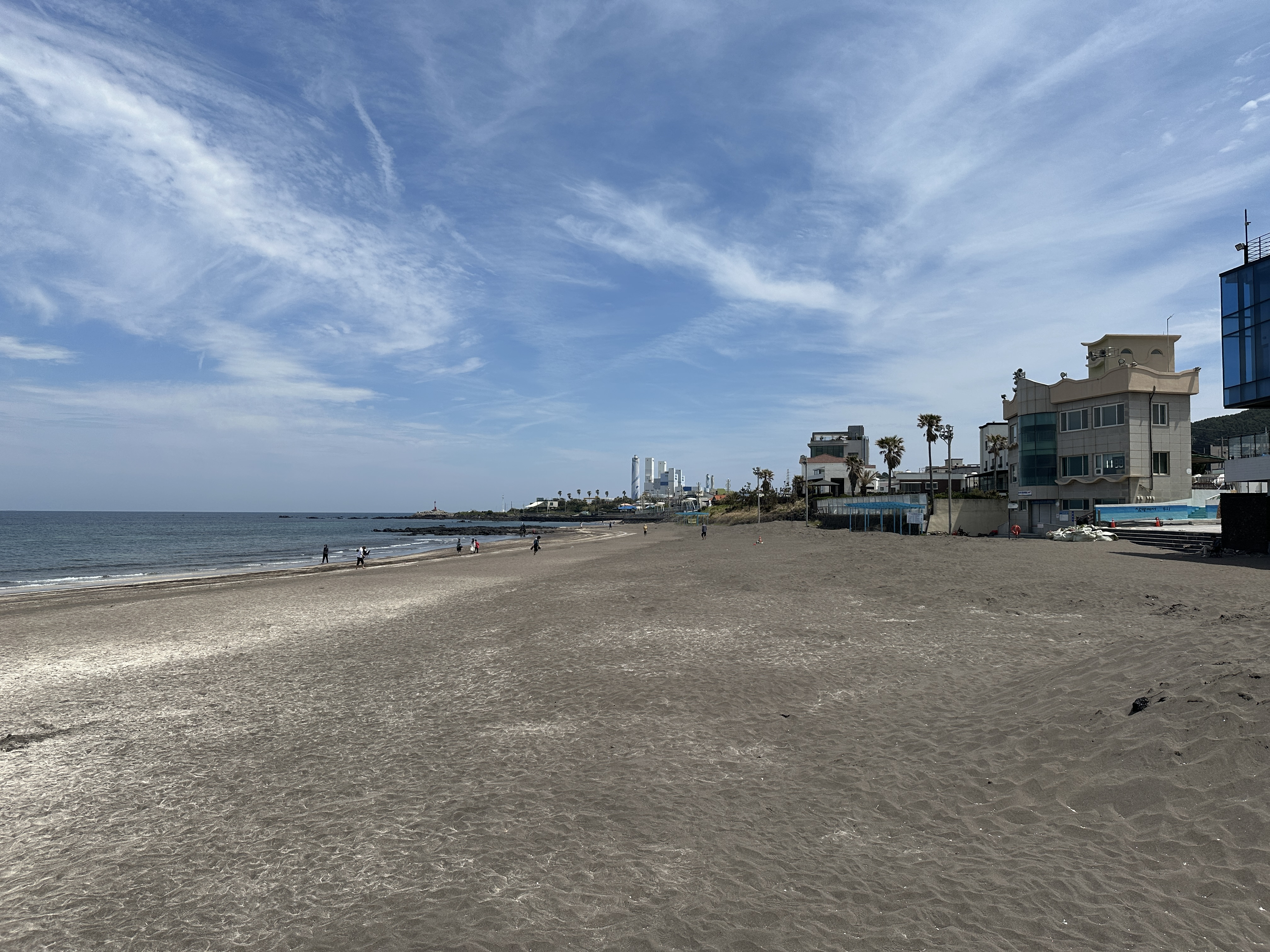
- The beach, viewed from the west entrance (2026)
- Interactive map of Samyang Beach
- Coordinates: 33.5263°N 126.5862°E
- Location: Samyang-dong, Jeju City, Jeju Province, South Korea

Korean name
- Hangul: 삼양해수욕장
- Hanja: 三陽海水浴場
- RR: Samyang haesuyokjang
- MR: Samyang haesuyokchang

Samyang Beach (Korean: 삼양해수욕장) is a beach in Samyang-dong, Jeju City, Jeju Province, South Korea. In 2023, its sandy portion had a length of 240m, width of 64m, and area of 13,821m^{2}.

The beach is popular with tourists and has long been famed for its black volcanic sands, which are thought to have health benefits. Each summer, a Samyang Black Sand Festival is held at the beach, which highlights the beauty and perceived health benefits of the sand. Various events are held during this time, including music and martial arts performances, the creation of black sand sculptures, and sand bathing.

The beach received its beach designation in 2002. The Black Sand Festival began to be held in that year. The beach is rapidly shrinking due to coastal erosion. One study in 2023 found that it had shrunk 30% from its size in 2018.

== See also ==
- List of beaches in Jeju Province
