= Hyeopjae Beach =

Beach in Jeju Province, South Korea

Coordinates: 33.3943°N 126.2399°E

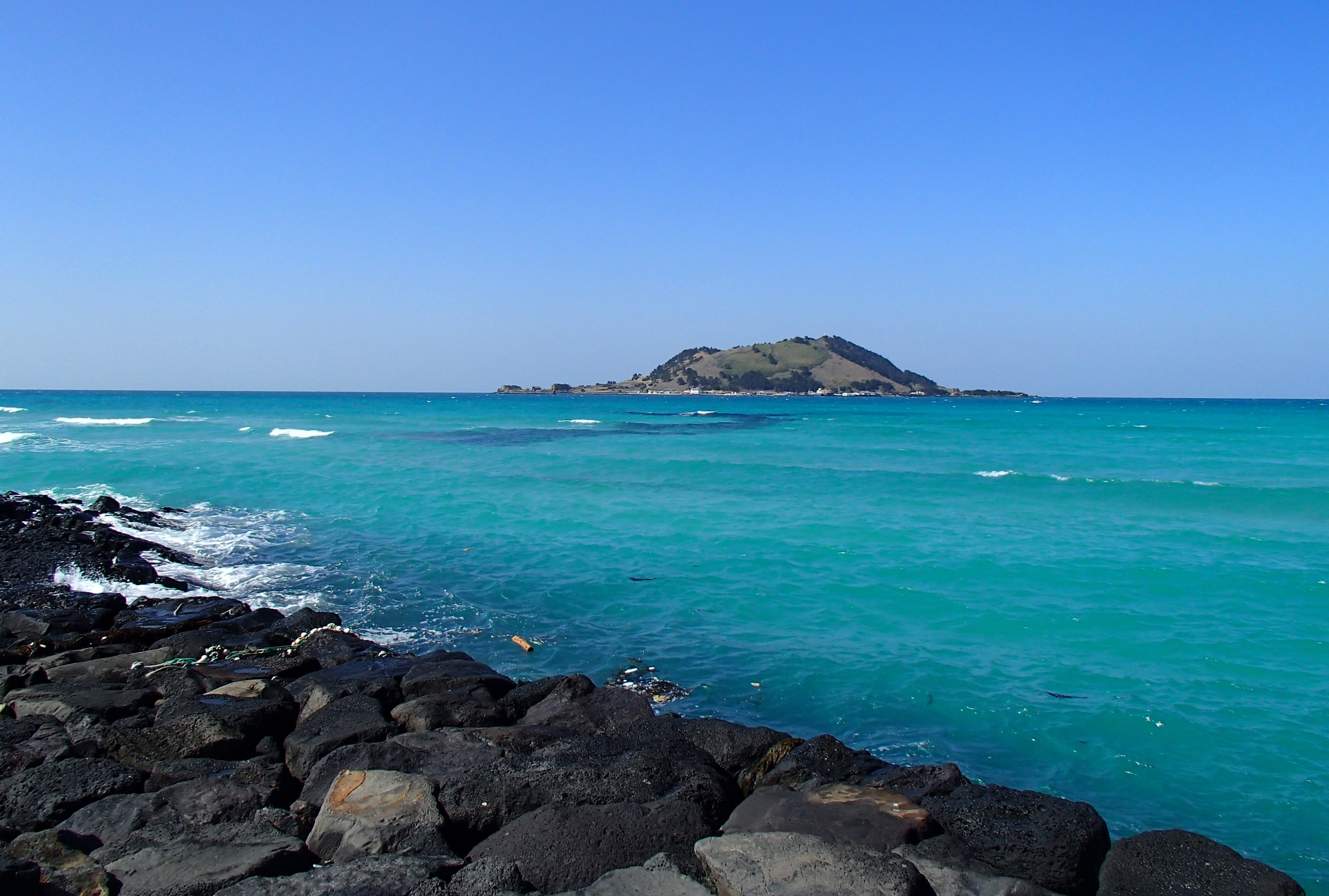

Hyeopjae Beach (Korean: 협재해수욕장) is a beach in Hallim, Jeju Province, South Korea.

== History ==
The beach was developed as a tourist attraction in the 1980s. There were hardly any facilities for tourists in the 1990s, but in 2019, it became a popular travel destination with 300,000 visitors.

== Description ==
The beach consists of white sand interspersed with black basalt. It is 1,100 m in length and 30 to 90 m in width. Biyangdo is located in front of the beach. The beach is popular for families as it has shallow water and gradual slope.

== In popular culture ==
The music video for Deux's song "In Summer" (여름 안에서) was filmed at the beach.

== See also ==
- List of beaches in Jeju Province

== External link ==
- Media related to Hyeopjae Beach at Wikimedia Commons
