= Woljeong-ri Beach =

Beach in Jeju City, South Korea

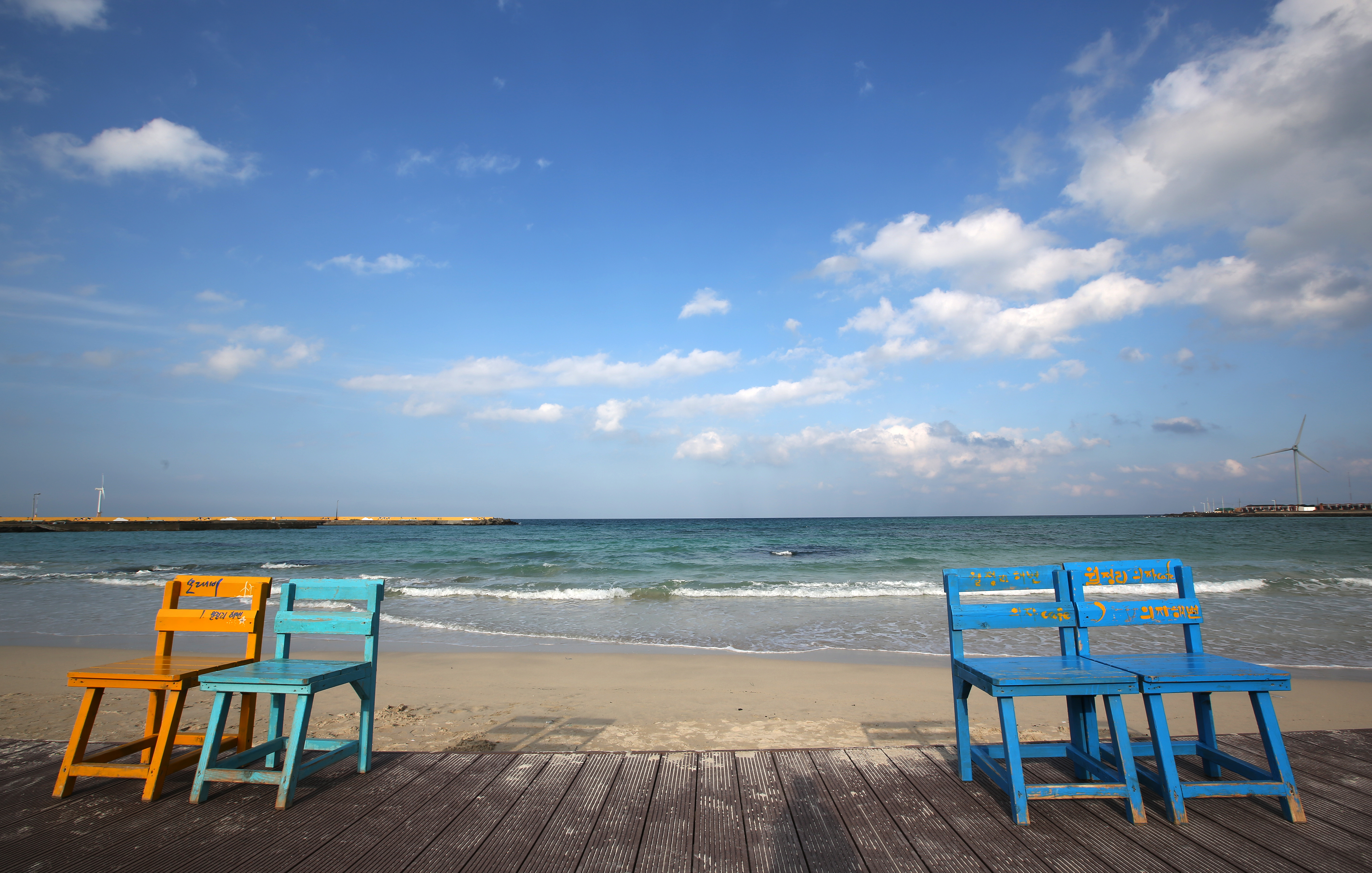
- The beach (2014)
- Interactive map of Woljeong-ri Beach
- Coordinates: 33.5559°N 126.7961°E
- Location: Gujwa, Jeju City, Jeju Province, South Korea

Korean name
- Hangul: 월정리해수욕장
- RR: Woljeong-ri haesuyokjang
- MR: Wŏlchŏng-ri haesuyokchang

Woljeong-ri Beach (Korean: 월정리해수욕장) is a beach in Gujwa, Jeju City, Jeju Province, South Korea.

The beach is popular with surfers, as its waves are considered to be of relatively consistent height. Paddleboarding and snorkeling are also commonly practiced. There are numerous tourist shops and restaurants nearby. The beach is one stop on the Jeju Olle Trail.

== Gallery ==
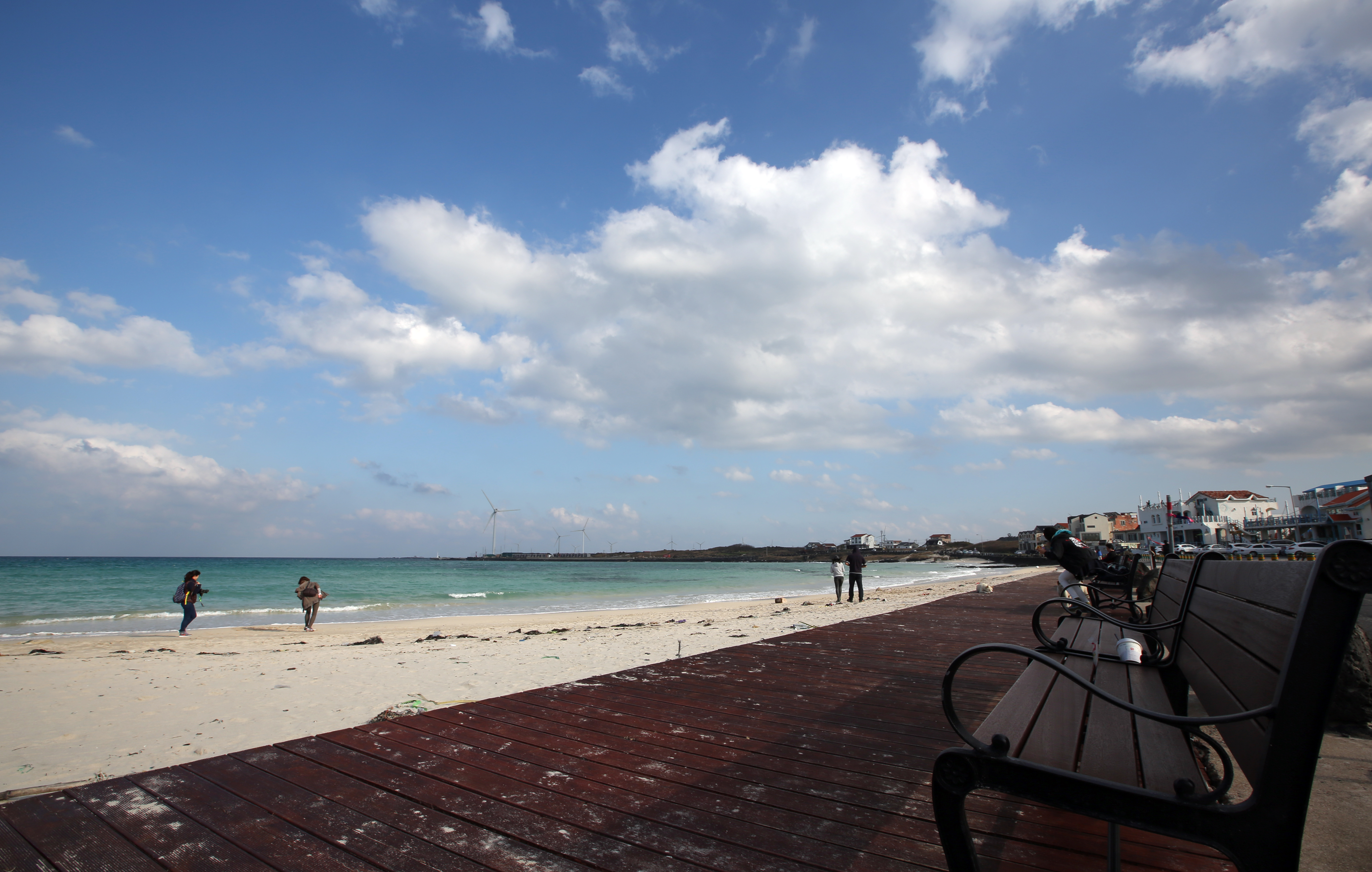
Facing east (2014)

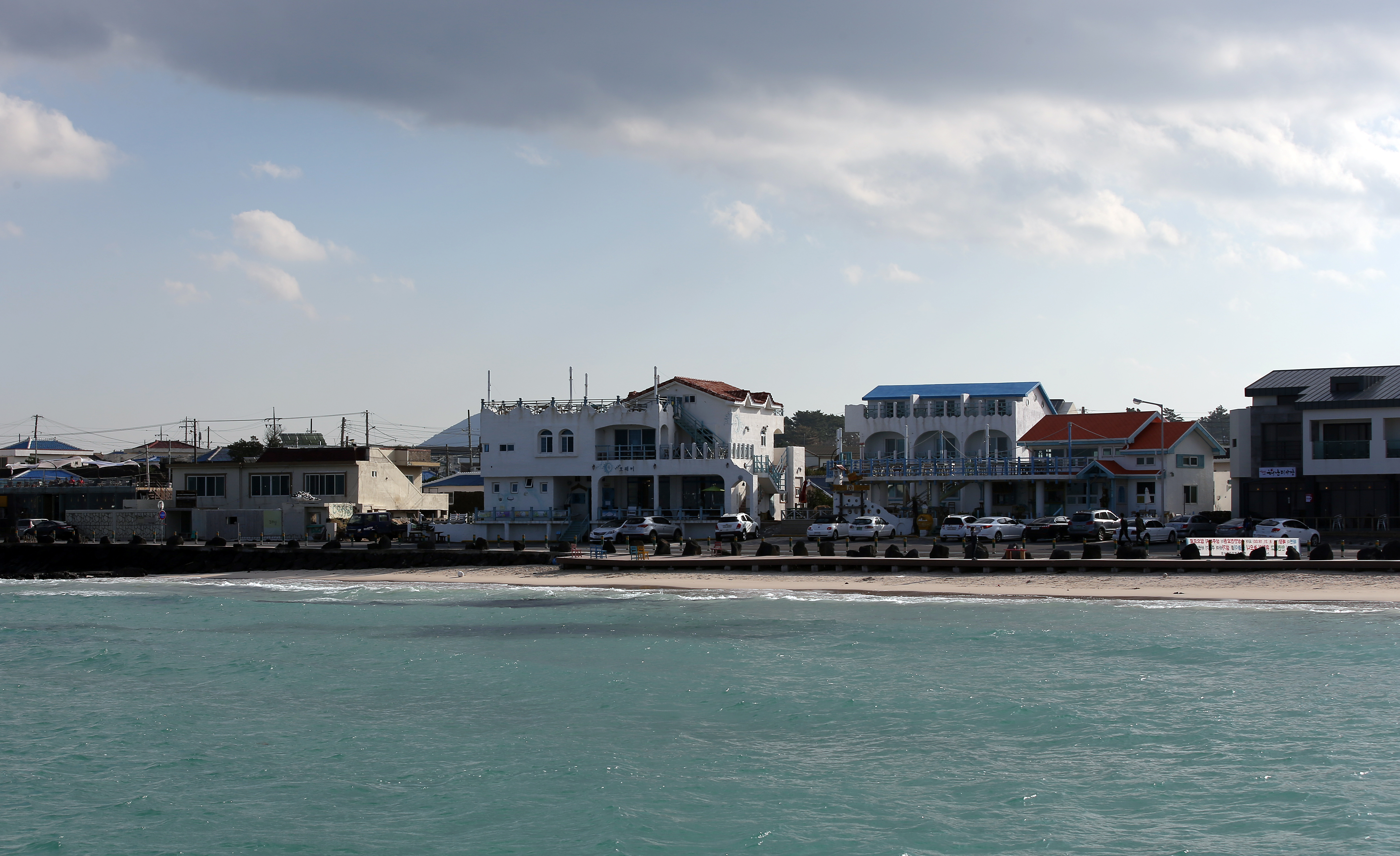
View from the ocean (2014)

== See also ==
- List of beaches in Jeju Province
