= Iho Tewoo Beach =

Beach in Jeju City, South Korea

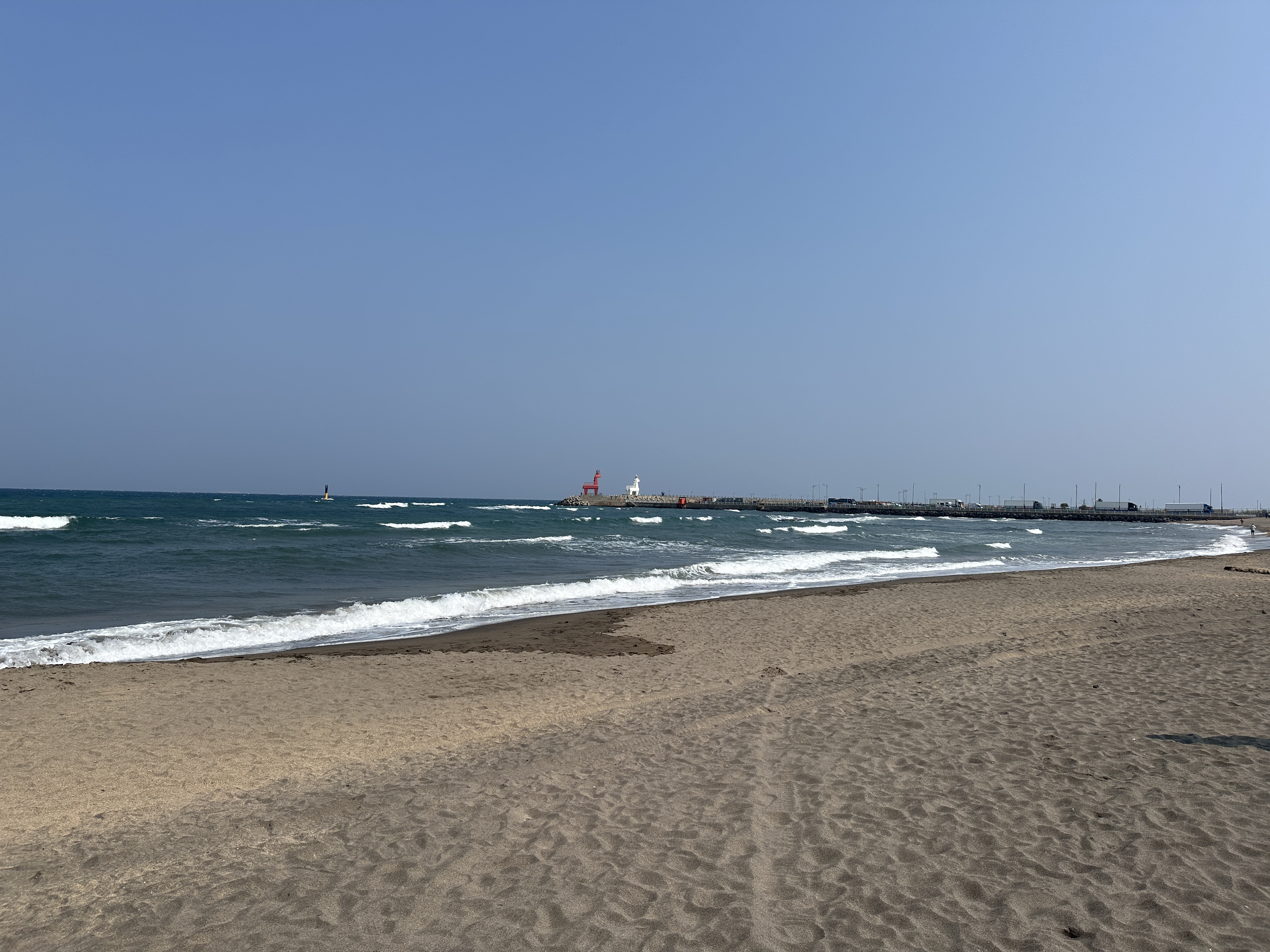
- The beach, facing northeast from the center (2026)
- Interactive map of Iho Tewoo Beach
- Coordinates: 33.4976°N 126.4527°E
- Location: Jeju City, Jeju Province, South Korea

Korean name
- Hangul: 이호테우해변
- RR: Ihoteu haebyeon
- MR: Ihot'eu haebyŏn

Iho Tewoo Beach (Korean: 이호테우해변) is a beach in Jeju City, Jeju Province, South Korea. The beach is named for village it is next to, Iho, as well as a traditional fishing raft called teu (테우) that used to be used in the area.

The beach has an annual Iho Tewoo Festival (이호테우축제) where various events and games are held. Events have been held to allow visitors to try riding the traditional teu rafts that the beach is named for.

== Gallery ==
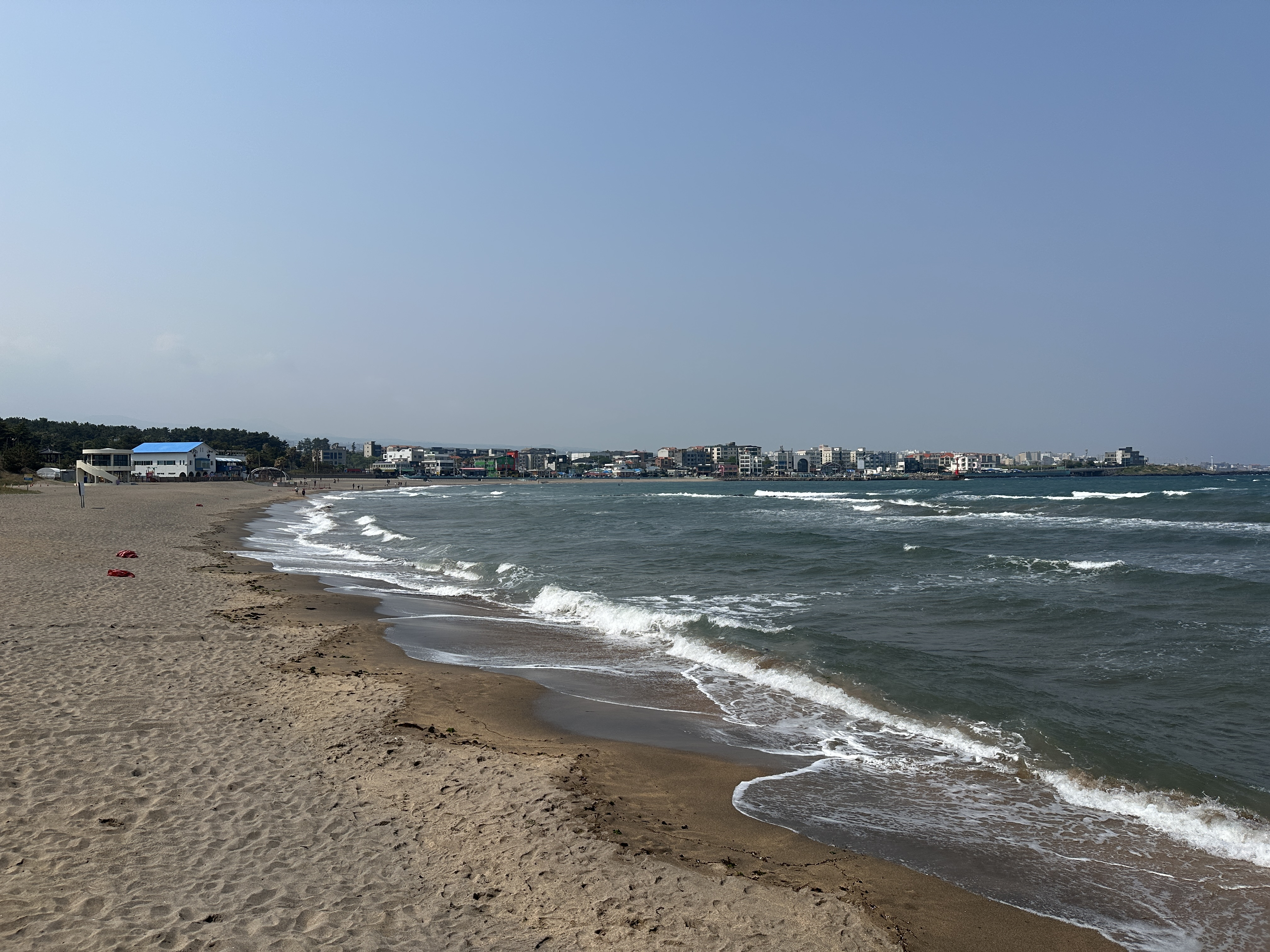
The beach, facing west from center (2026)

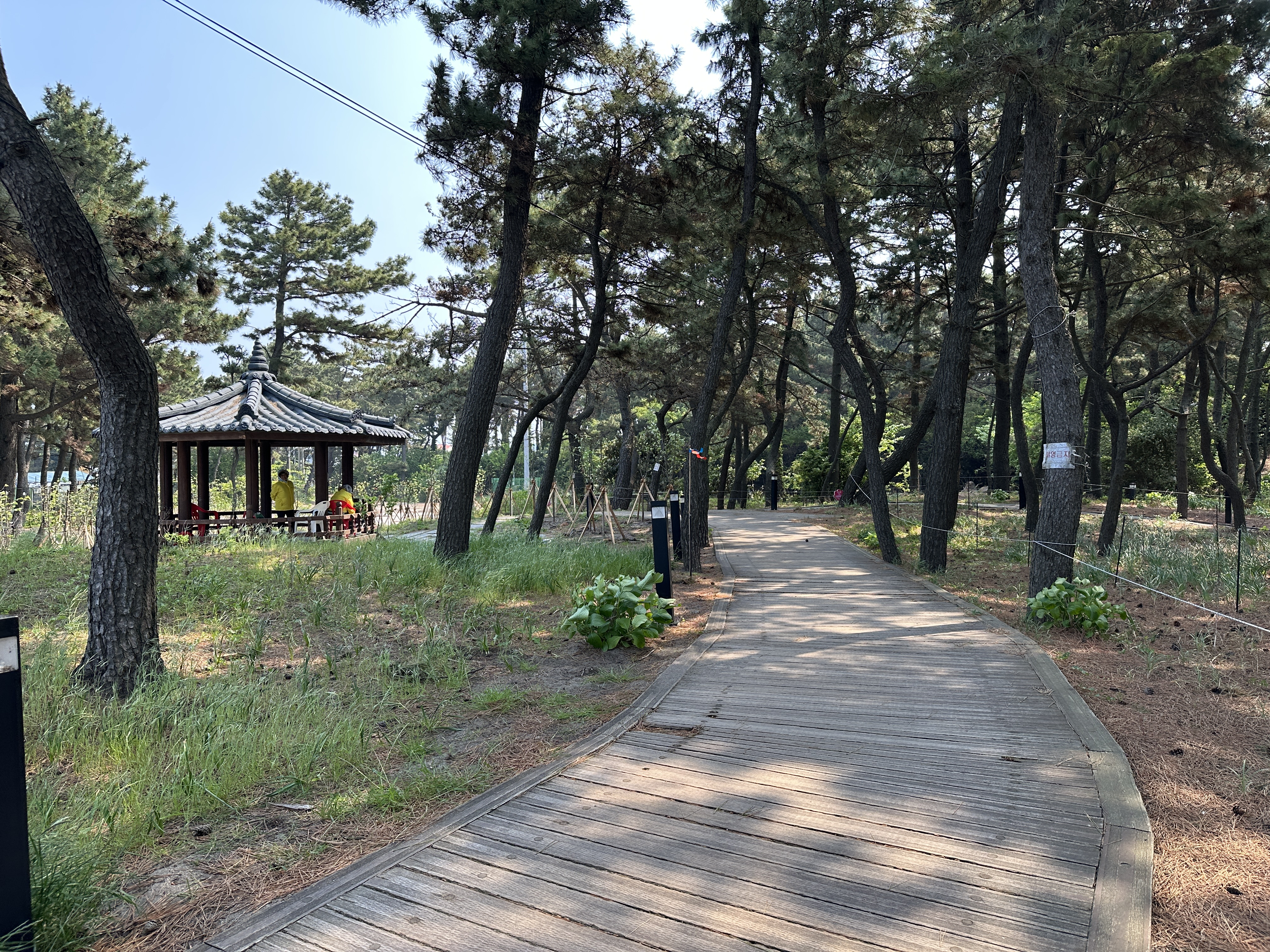
Hiking trail next to the beach (2026)

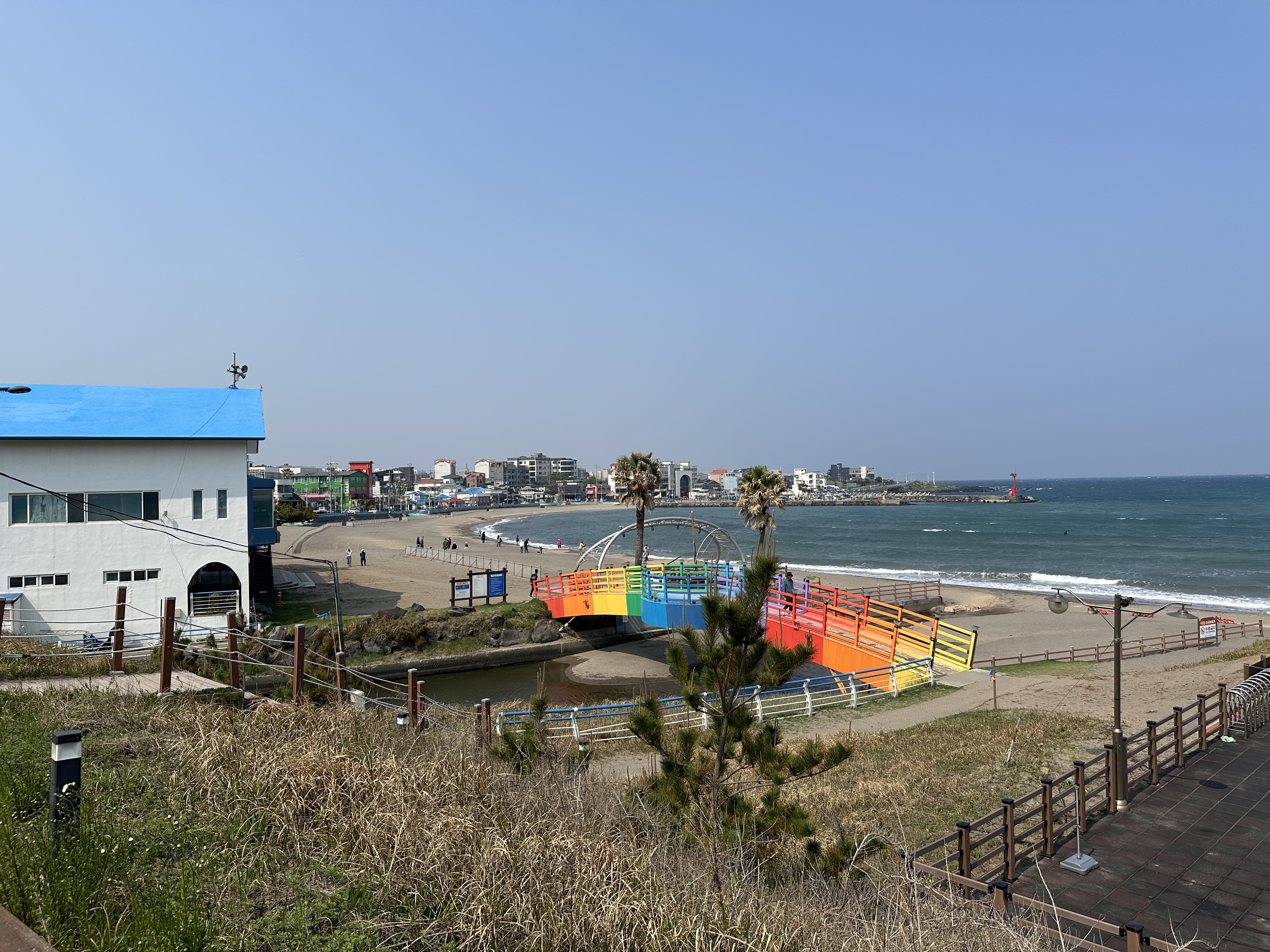
The beach, with rainbow bridge, viewed from hiking trail (2026)

== See also ==
- List of beaches in Jeju Province
