= Songdo Beach =

First ever beach in South Korea

- Beach
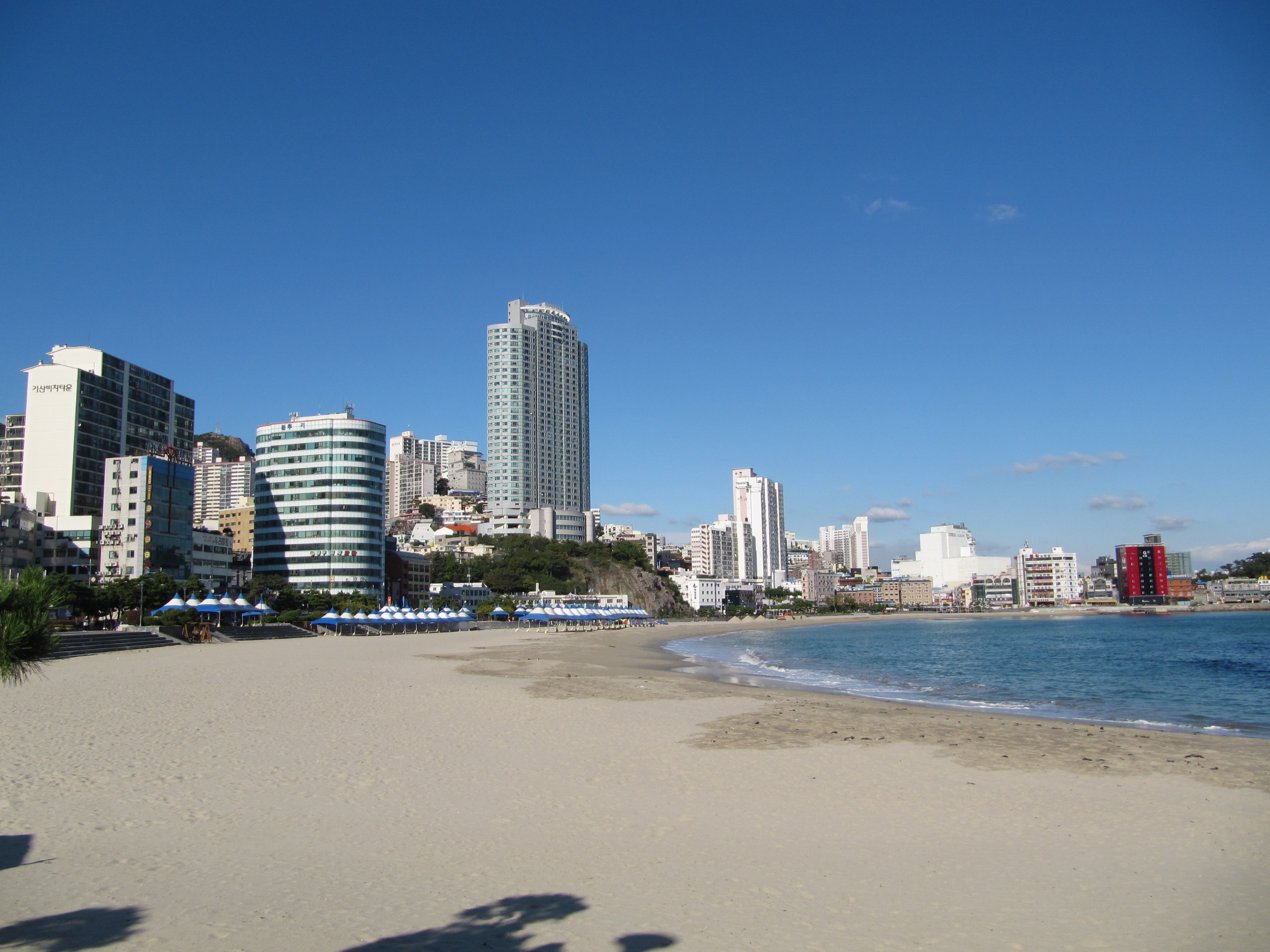
- Interactive map of Songdo Beach
- Coordinates: 35°04′34″N 129°01′05″E
- Location: Busan, South Korea
- Offshore water bodies: Sea of Japan

Korean name
- Hangul: 송도해수욕장
- Hanja: 松島海水浴場
- RR: Songdo haesuyokjang
- MR: Songdo haesuyokchang

Songdo Beach (Korean: 송도해수욕장) is a man-made beach in Busan, South Korea. It was created in 1913. The name "Songdo" (the Island of Pines) was given due to the thick pine forest covering the island.

Songdo Beach was the first public beach in Korea, and was developed by the Songdo Amusement Co., Ltd. In 1964, a cable car passed directly over the beach connecting Geobuk (Turtle) Island with Songdo, and a girder bridge linking Songlim Park with Geobuk Island were completed.

== Gallery ==
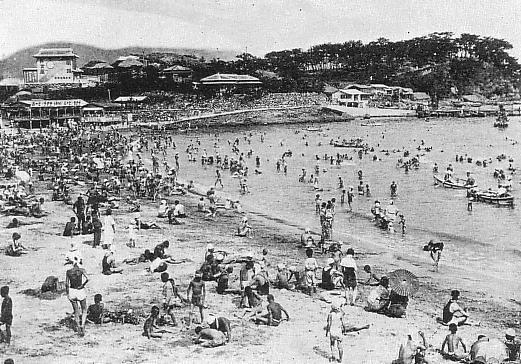
The beach around 1930

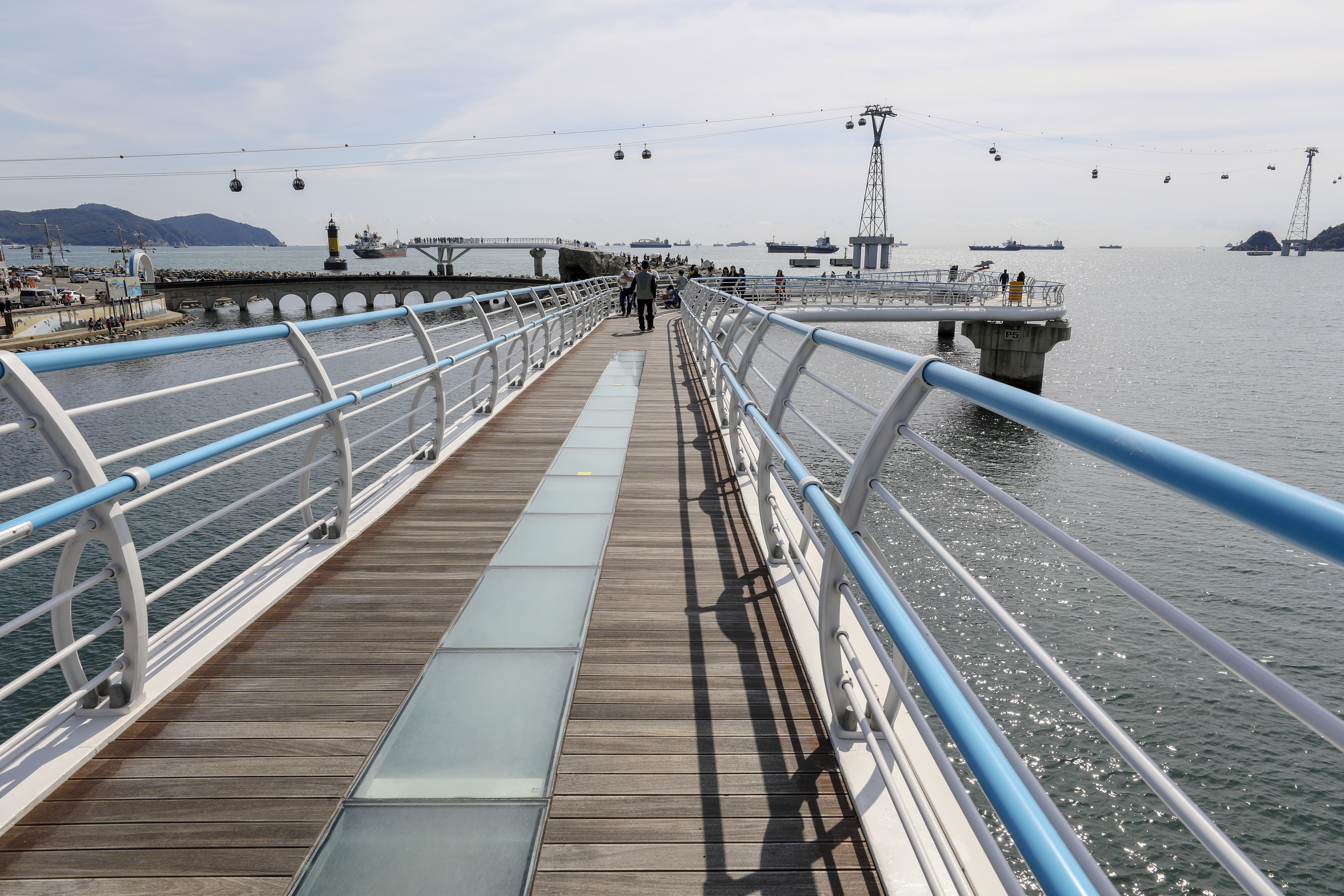
The Songdo Cloud Trails Skywalk (2018)

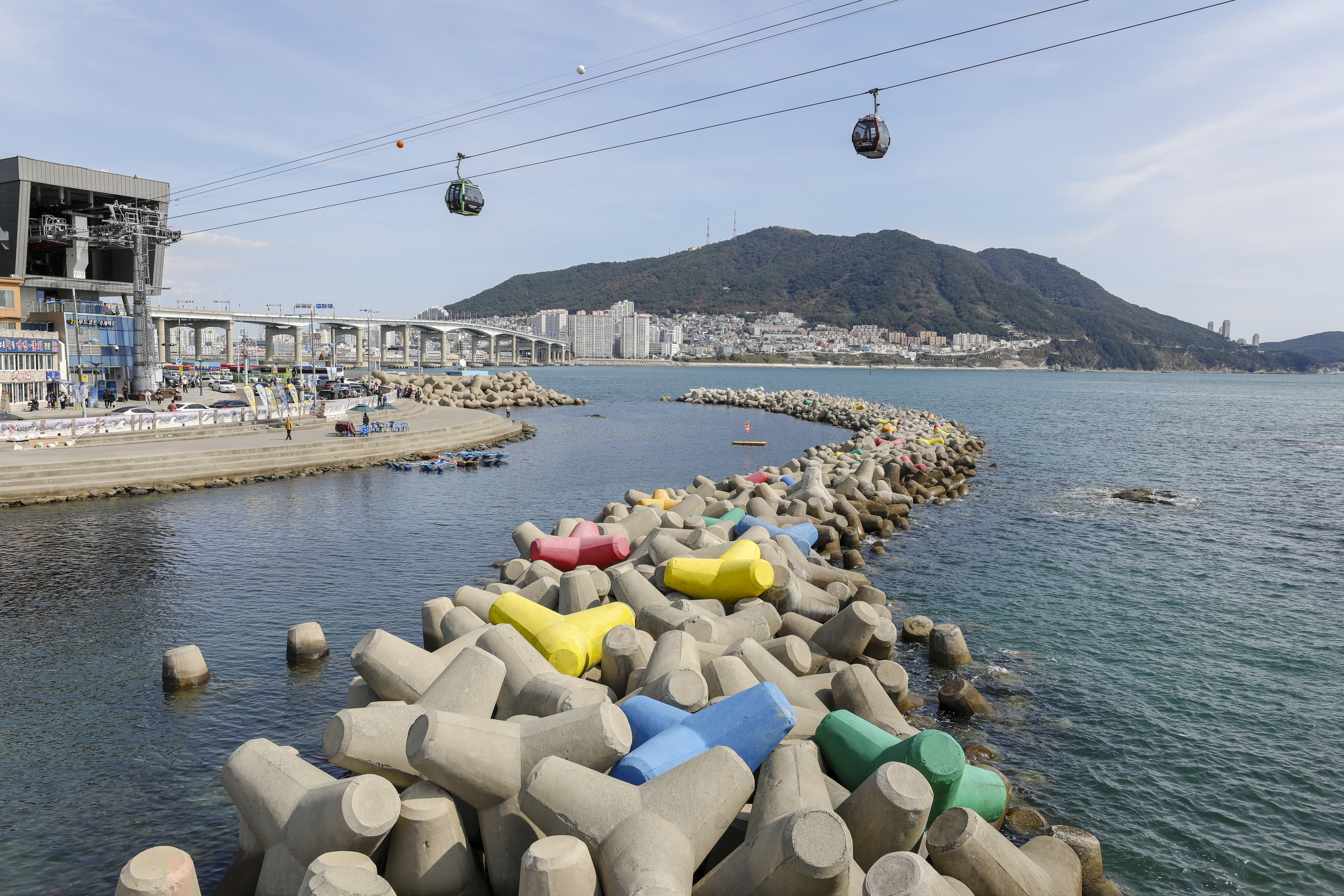
View of the cable cars (2018)

== See also ==
- Songdo: a city near Incheon that shares the same name
- Haeundae Beach: another beach in Busan
- Gwangalli Beach: another beach in Busan
