= Udo (Jeju Province) =

Island in South Korea

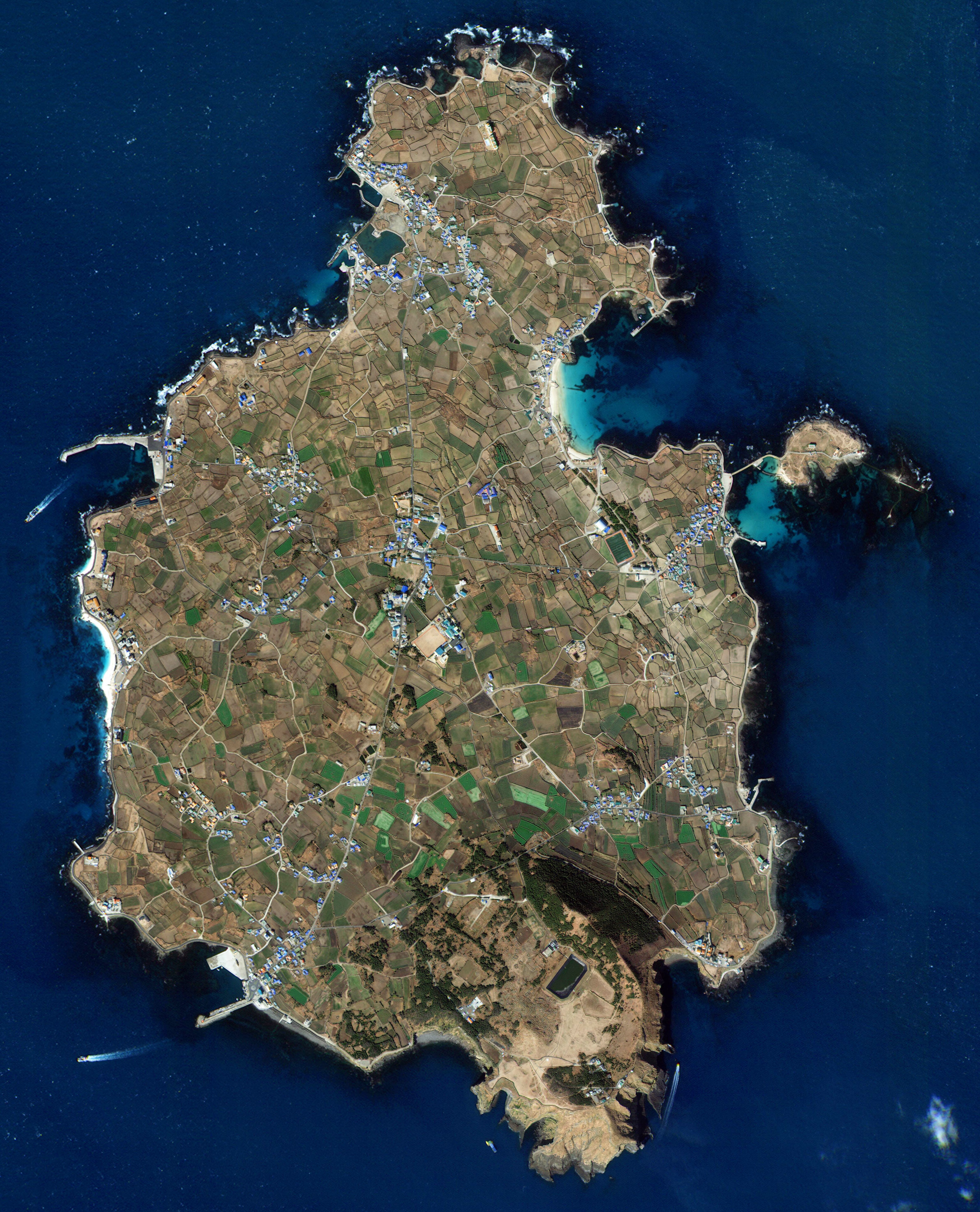
- A satellite image of the island (2015)
- Interactive map of Udo

Geography
- Location: Udo-myeon, Jeju City, Jeju-do, South Korea
- Coordinates: 33°30′19″N 126°57′21″E
- Area: 6.18 km^{2} (2.39 sq mi)

Administration
- South Korea

Demographics
- Population: 1,862
- Ethnic groups: Korean

Korean name
- Hangul: 우도
- Hanja: 牛島
- Lit.: Cow island
- RR: Udo
- MR: Udo

Udo (Korean: 우도), also known as U Island and sometimes Soseom (소섬), is an island in Jeju Province, South Korea. It is 2.8 km (1.7 mi) off the coast of Jeju Island, and is the second-largest island in the province.

The island is one of Jeju's most popular destinations, with 2.23 million visitors in 2016. It is known for its scenic beaches, sheer rocky cliffs, and sea caves. It is reachable by ferry, and bikes and public transit are available on the island.

== Description ==
"Udo" and "Soseom" both mean "cow island"; when viewed from the side, the island is said to resemble a cow lying down. The island was also referred to as "Yeonpyeong" (연평; 演坪) in the early 1900s.

Udo is a volcanic island. With the exception of the peaks Someori Oreum (썸오리오름) and Udobong (우도봉; 牛島峰), the island is relatively flat. Around 71% of the island is flat and used for agriculture. The coast of the island is mostly rocky, with sharp cliffs and even sea caves. It has no rivers or springs; drinking water is obtained through rainwater.

In 2010, the population was 1,575, with 756 males and 819 females. The island is subdivided into four administrative districts. An estimated 40% of residents' income comes from farming, with the remaining income coming from fishing. The island is famous for its peanuts and garlic. Haenyeo (female divers) forage off the coasts of the island. Pigs and cattle are bred on the island. The island has an elementary and middle school.

The former island Biyangdo (different from the one in Hallim-eup) is now connected to the east side of the island by a land bridge.

== History ==
There is evidence of private human activity on the island from 1698 CE. Permission was granted for average people to move onto the island in 1840.

In 1914, it was made part of Yeonpyeong-ri, Gujwa-myeon, Jeju County. In 1946, it became part of Yeonpyeong-ri, Gujwa-myeon, Bukjeju County. in 1986, it was made part of Udo-myeon, which was part of Bukjeju County. In 2006, Udo-myeon was made part of Jeju City.

== Tourism ==
Udo is one of the most visited spots in Jeju Province. It reportedly had 2.23 million visitors in 2016. The island is widely considered to be scenic, with Korean dramas and films having been filmed on the island.

Ferries travel in 30 minute intervals between Jeju and Udo, from 9 a.m. to 5 p.m. Udo has two ports: Cheonjin Port and Haumokdong Port. The trip reportedly takes around 15 minutes. Tourists can rent bicycles and electric bicycles. The island also has a bus system. In recent years, restrictions have been placed on the renting of cars and all-terrain vehicles on the island, as the high volume of tourists led to high traffic congestion and noise.

The island is part of the Jeju Olle Trail, with the trail going around the island's shore. It takes approximately 4 to 5 hours, and there are many restaurants and stops on the course.

The island is known for its ice cream and Korean Chinese food.

=== Eight Sights of Udo ===
The island is considered to have eight scenic spots, together dubbed the Eight Sights of Udo (우도팔경; 牛島八景). The list was coined by one of the island's residents in 1983. The list includes:

- Juganmyeongwol (주간명월; 晝間明月)
  - A cave said to be filled with moonlight during the day, around 10 to 11 a.m.
- Yahangeobeom (야항어범; 夜航漁帆)
  - Evening views on the island, with boats lit up on the ocean.
- Cheonjingwansan (천진관산; 天津觀山)
  - The view of Hallasan from Dongcheonjindong Port, considered the best place to view the mountain.
- Jiducheongsa (지두청사; 地頭靑莎)
  - The view of the island from its highest point at Udo peak.
- Jeonpomangdo (전포망도; 前浦望島)
  - The view of the island from Jeju, where it looks like a cow lying down.
- Huhaeseokbyeok (후해석벽; 後海石壁)
  - A scenic rock cliff with deep grooves formed by erosion over time.
- Dongangyeonggul (동안경굴; 東岸鯨窟)
  - A sea cave that can be entered during low tide.
- Seobinbaeksa (서빈백사; 西濱白沙)
  - A beach with bright white sands on the west coast.

=== Other attractions ===
The island has three beaches: Dolcani Beach (톨카니 해변; 돌카니 해변), Geommeolle Beach, and Sanho Beach. Geommeolle Beach is a black sandy beach. Sanho Beach is Natural Monument of South Korea No. 438. There is a lighthouse high up on the island that offers scenic views.

== Gallery ==
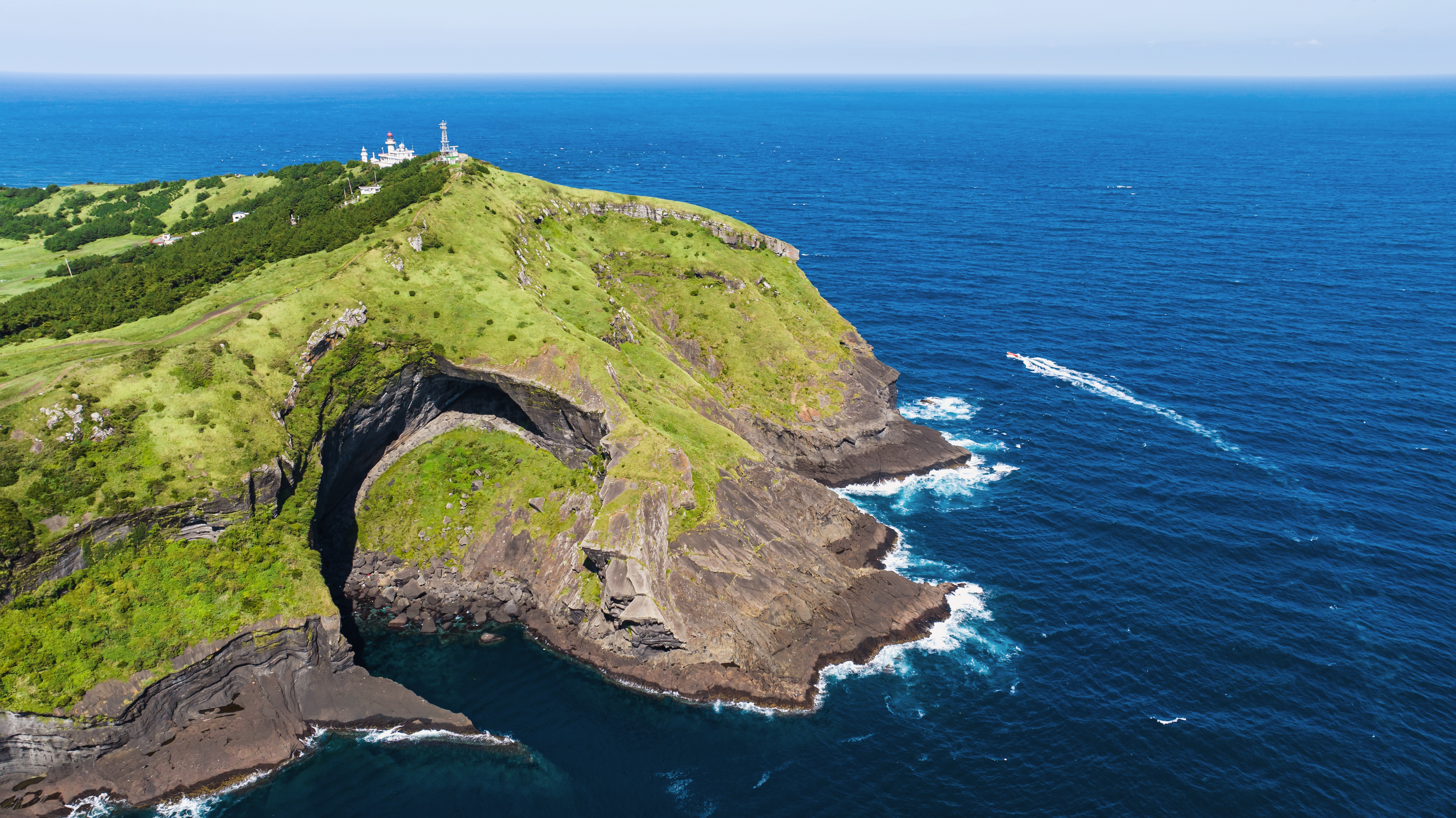
Aerial view of the island (2023)

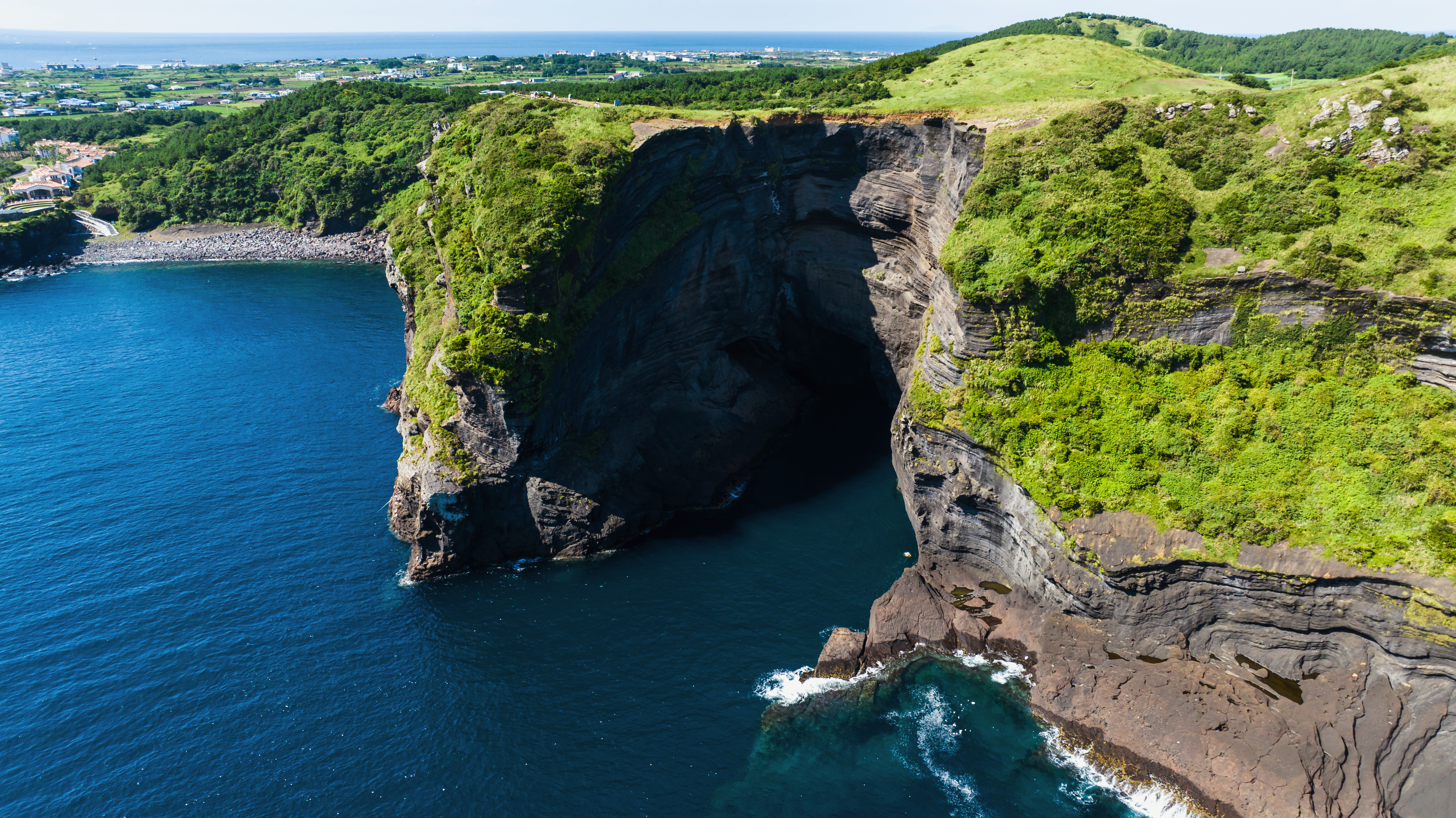
Cliffs on the island (2023)

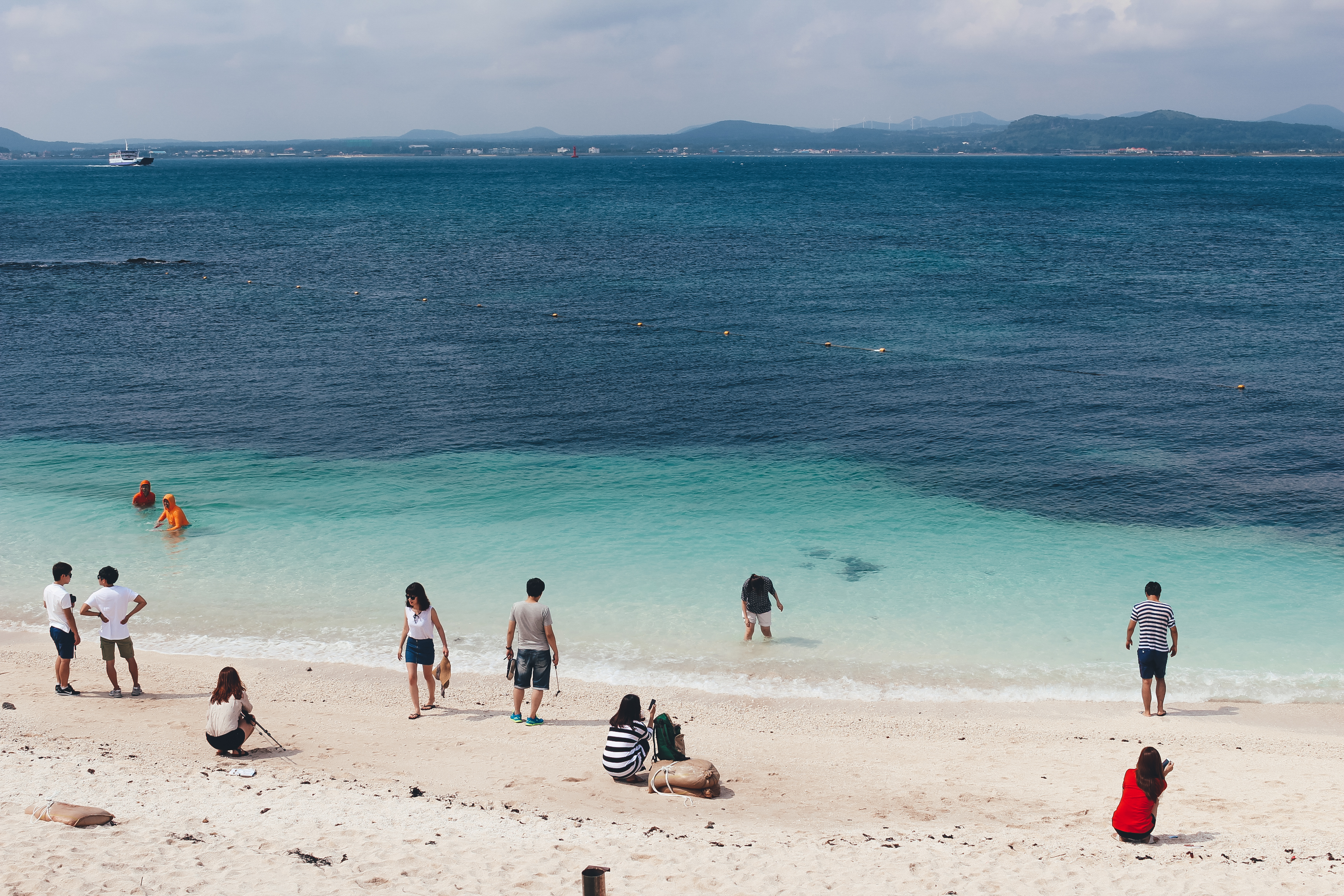
The white beach sight of Seobinbaeksa (2014)

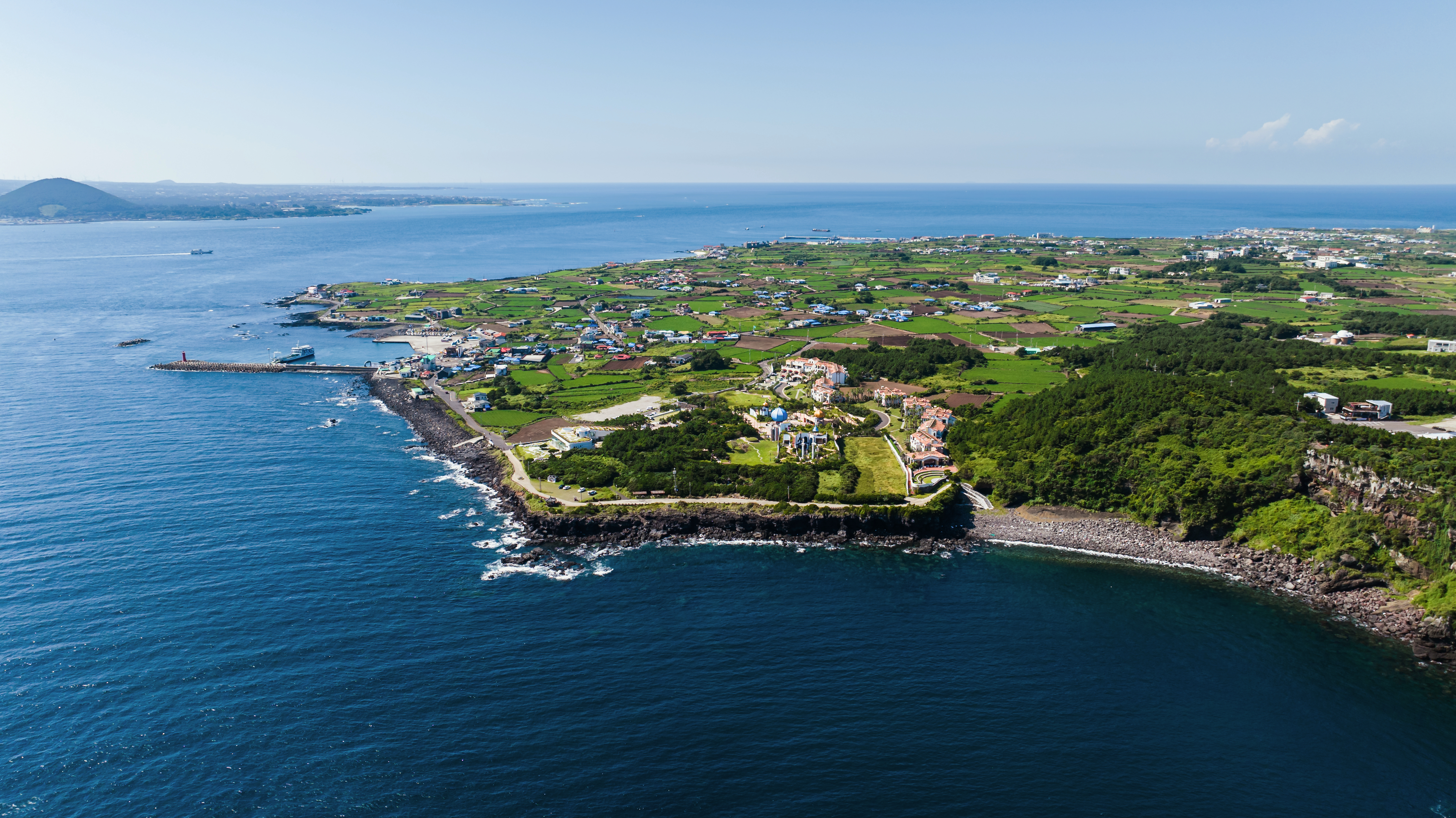
Settlements and flatland of the island (2023)

== See also ==
- Tourism in South Korea
