= Biyangdo =

Island in Jeju Province, South Korea

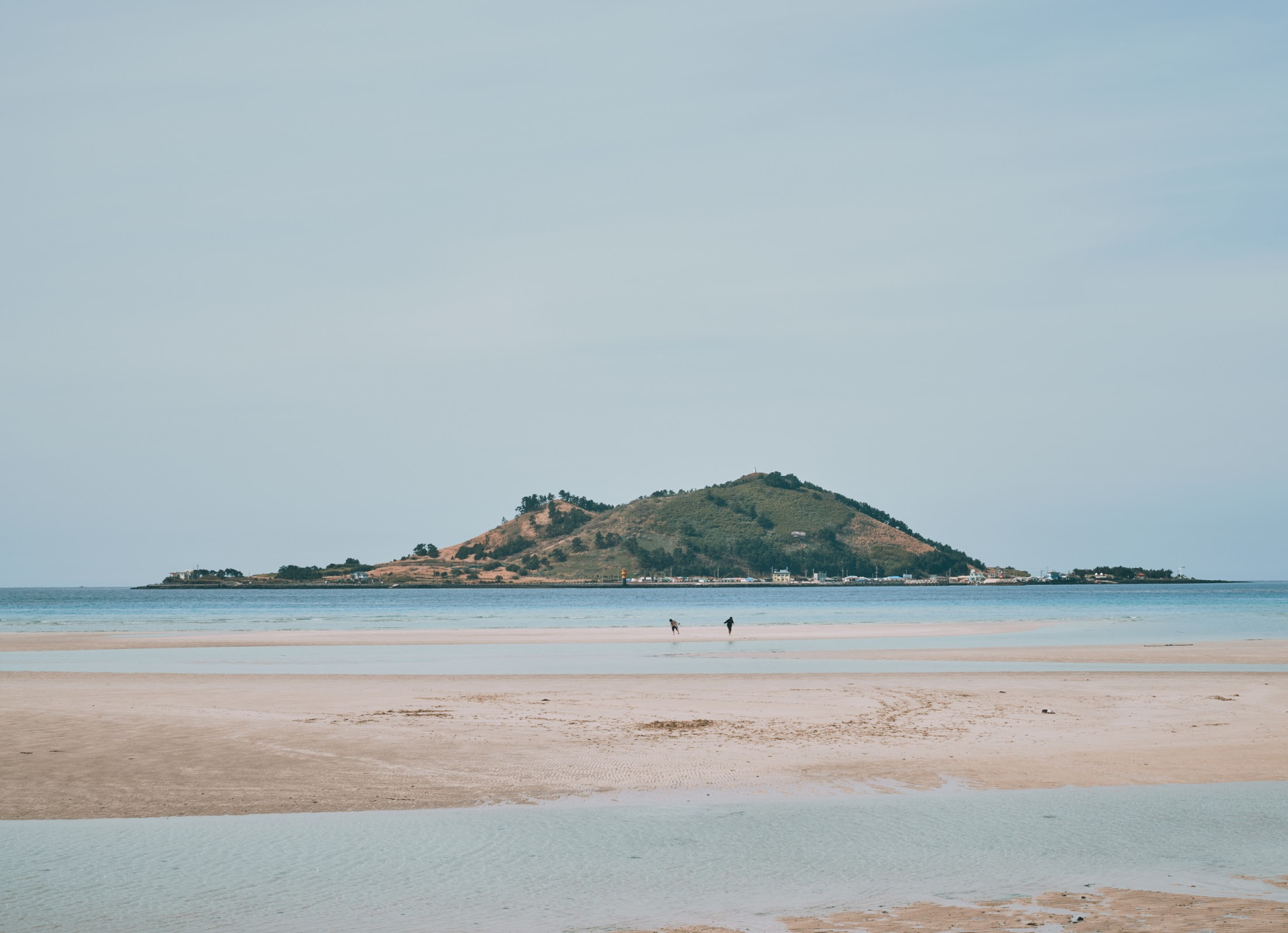
- The island, viewed from Jeju (2021)
- Interactive map of Biyangdo

Geography
- Location: Jeju City, Jeju Province, South Korea
- Coordinates: 33°24′32″N 126°13′39″E

Korean name
- Hangul: 비양도
- Hanja: 飛揚島
- RR: Biyangdo
- MR: Piyangdo

Biyangdo (Korean: 비양도) is an island in Jeju City, Jeju Province, South Korea.

The island is accessible by a ferry from Hallim Port on Jeju Island.

There is another Biyangdo that is now connected to Udo which is also part of Jeju City.

== Toponymy ==
The island was once called Jukdo (죽도; 竹島; lit. 'bamboo island') due to its abundant bamboo plants. It has also been called the "Island of Flight" (비상의 섬; 飛翔의 섬), as there was a local belief that the island had been a peak that flew off of the nearby Hallasan on Jeju Island.

== Description ==
It has an area of 0.59 km^{2} (0.23 mi^{2}) and a coastline of 3.15 km (1.96 mi). The island is volcanic and roughly circular. It has a 114 m (374 ft) tall peak called Biyangbong (비양봉). There are two volcanic craters on the island that have Oreocnide frutescens trees that grow around them; this is the only place in South Korea that harbors those trees. This motivated Jeju Province to make the area a Monument of Jeju Province.

There is a record of a volcanic event on the island around 1002 CE, during the fifth year of Mokjong of Goryeo's reign. For five days, lava flowed out of four holes on the mountain Seosan (서산; 瑞山) on the island.

In 2010, the island's population was 167, with 82 men and 85 women. Settlements were concentrated on the southeastern coast of the island. Most of the island is covered by forests, and there is limited agricultural space. The main industry on the island is fishing; the island is reportedly popular for fishers during the summertime.

== Gallery ==
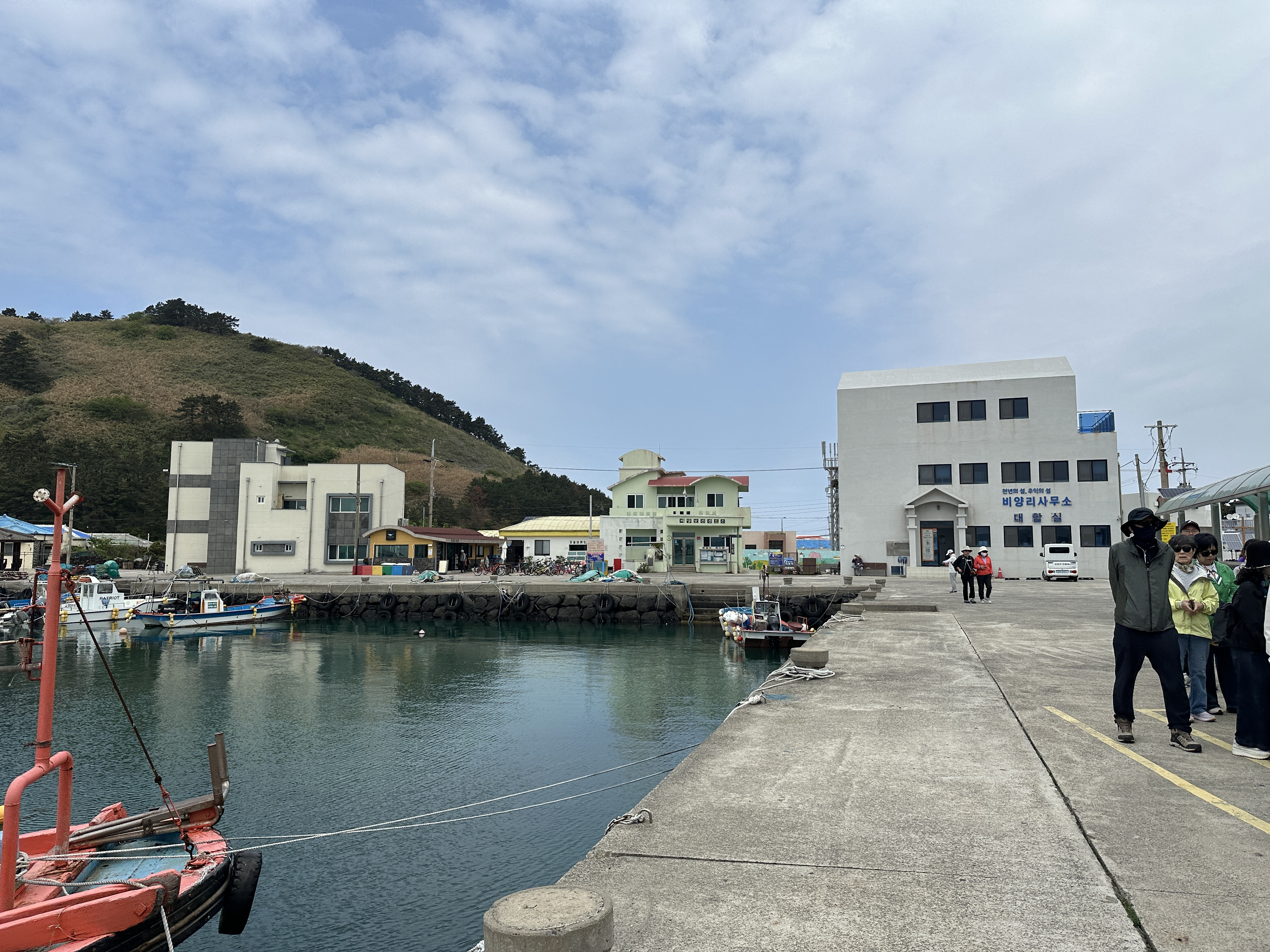
The harbor on the island (2026)

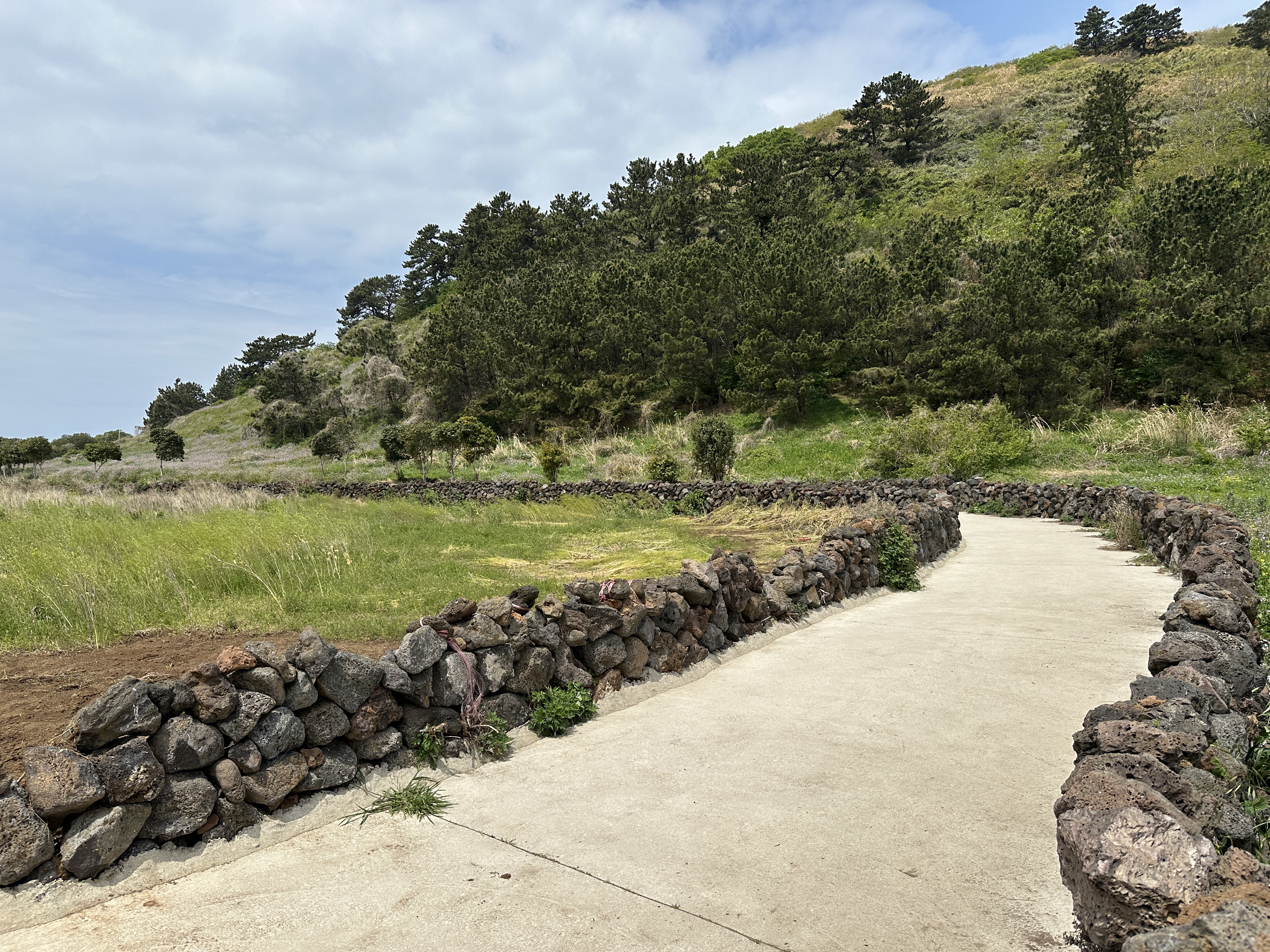
Hiking trail on the island (2026)

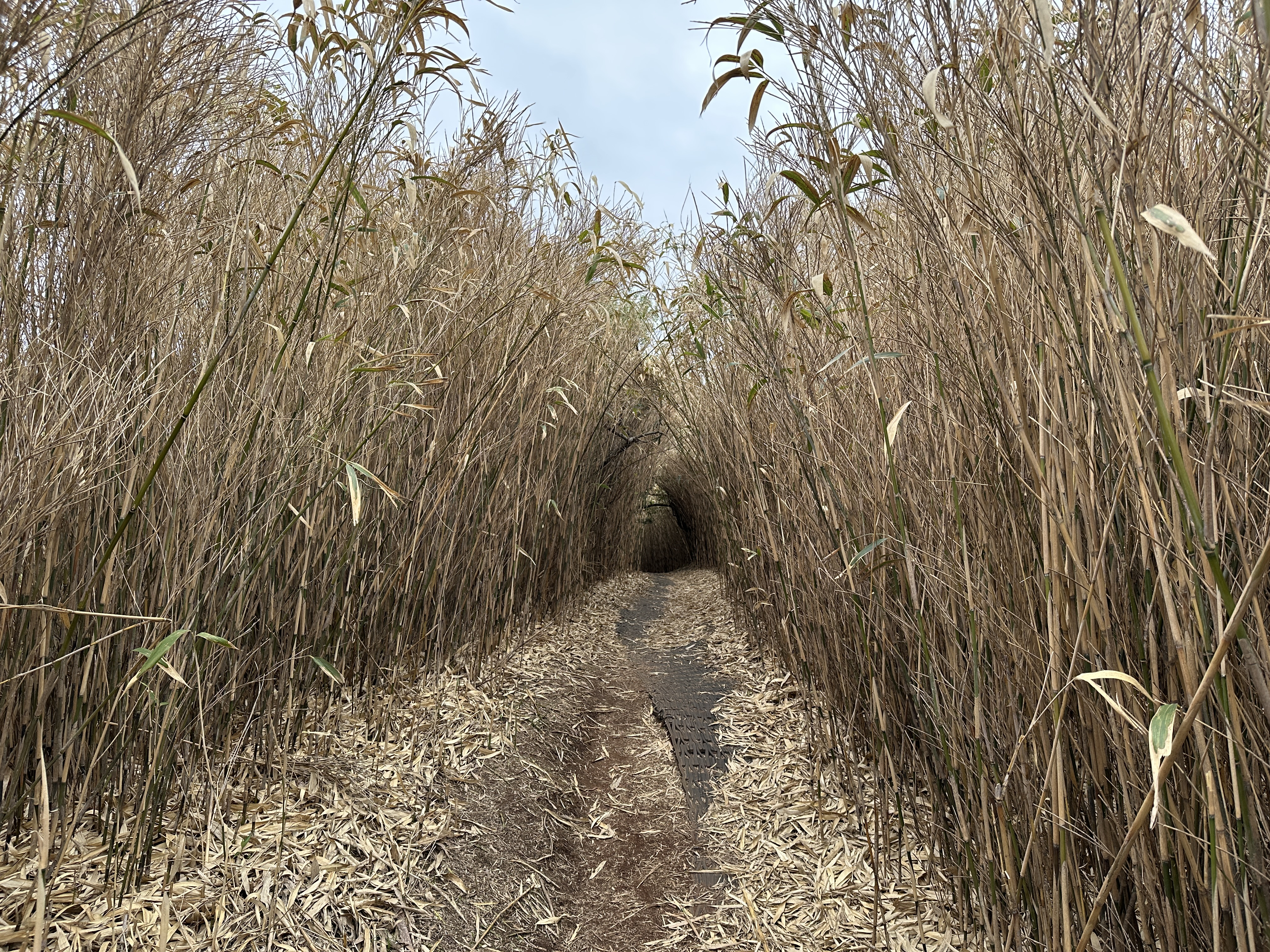
Bamboo forest on the mountain (2026)

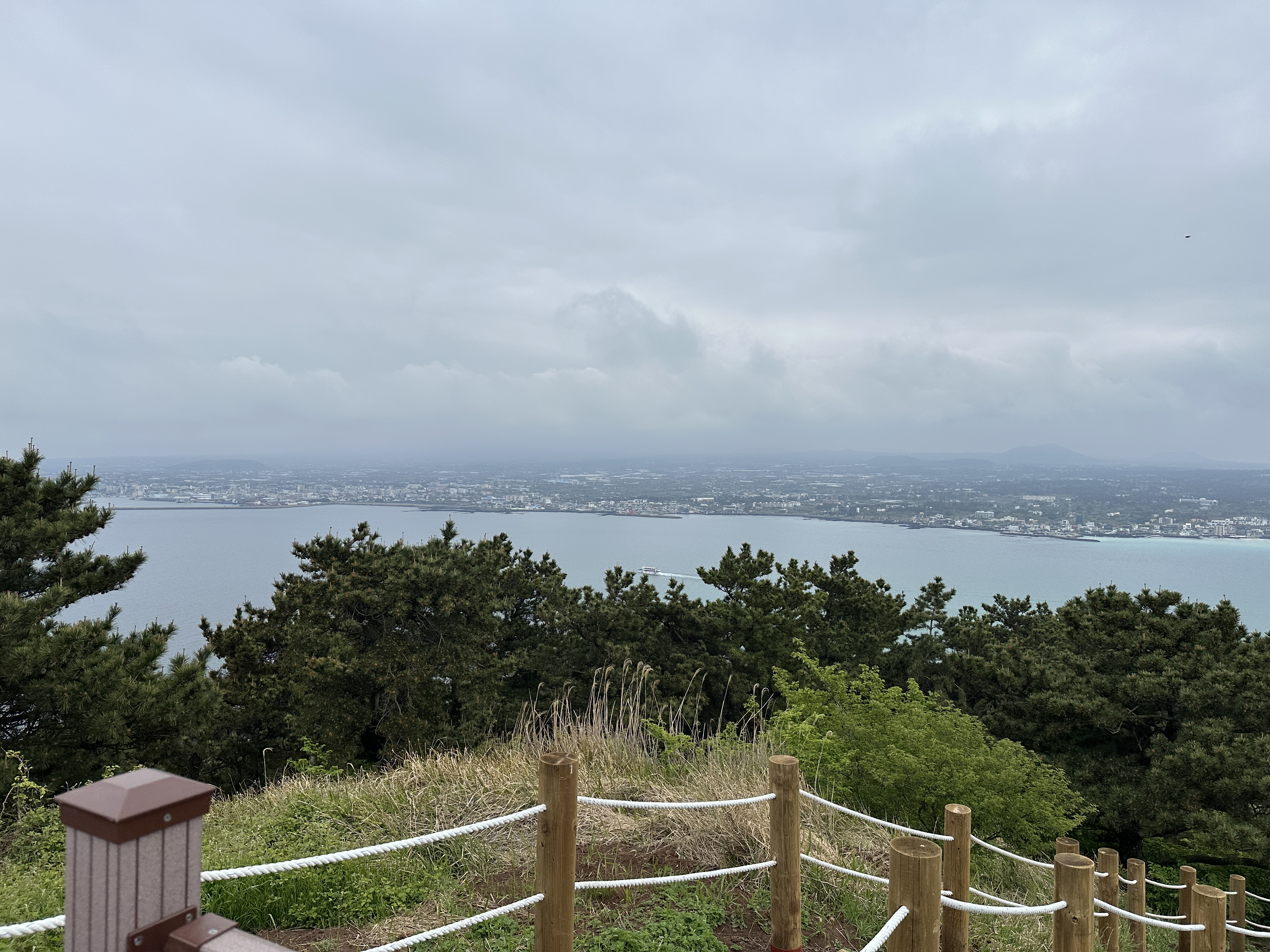
View from the top of the mountain (2026)

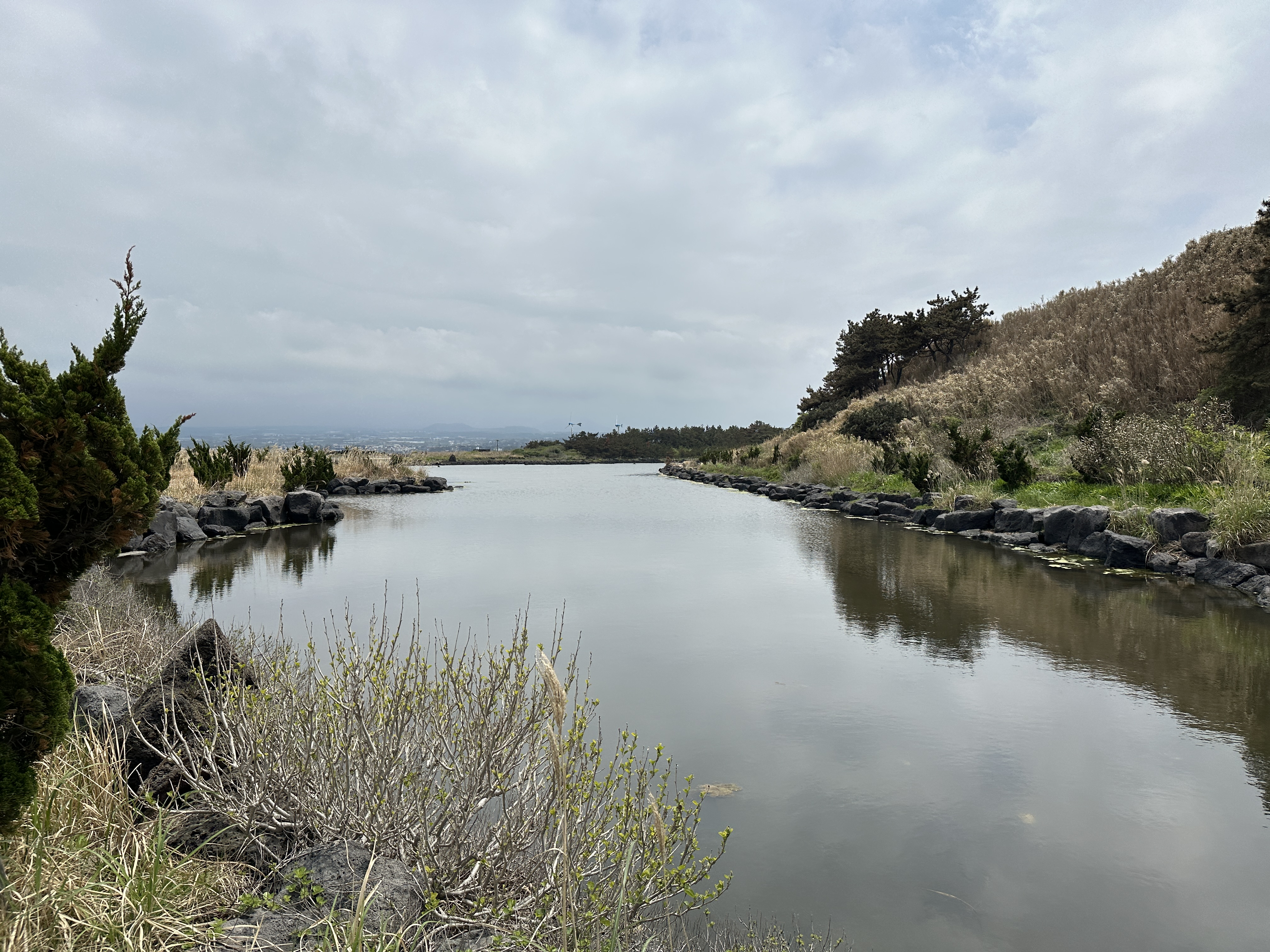
Pond on the island (2026)
