= Sokcho Beach =

Beach in Sokcho, South Korea

- The beach (2026)
- Interactive map of Sokcho Beach
- Coordinates: 38.1882°N 128.6056°E
- Location: Sokcho, Gangwon Province, South Korea
- Website: sokchobeach.co.kr

Korean name
- Hangul: 속초해수욕장
- RR: Sokcho haesuyokjang
- MR: Sokch'o haesuyokchang

Sokcho Beach (Korean: 속초해수욕장) is a public beach in Sokcho, South Korea. It first opened in 1976. Its length is 940m and its width is 43m.

The beach is host to various events. For example, the beach has held a summer festival with live music, as well as a beach art installation. Like many other beaches in South Korea, the beach is shrinking due to coastal erosion.
