= Hamdeok Beach =

Beach in Jeju City, South Korea

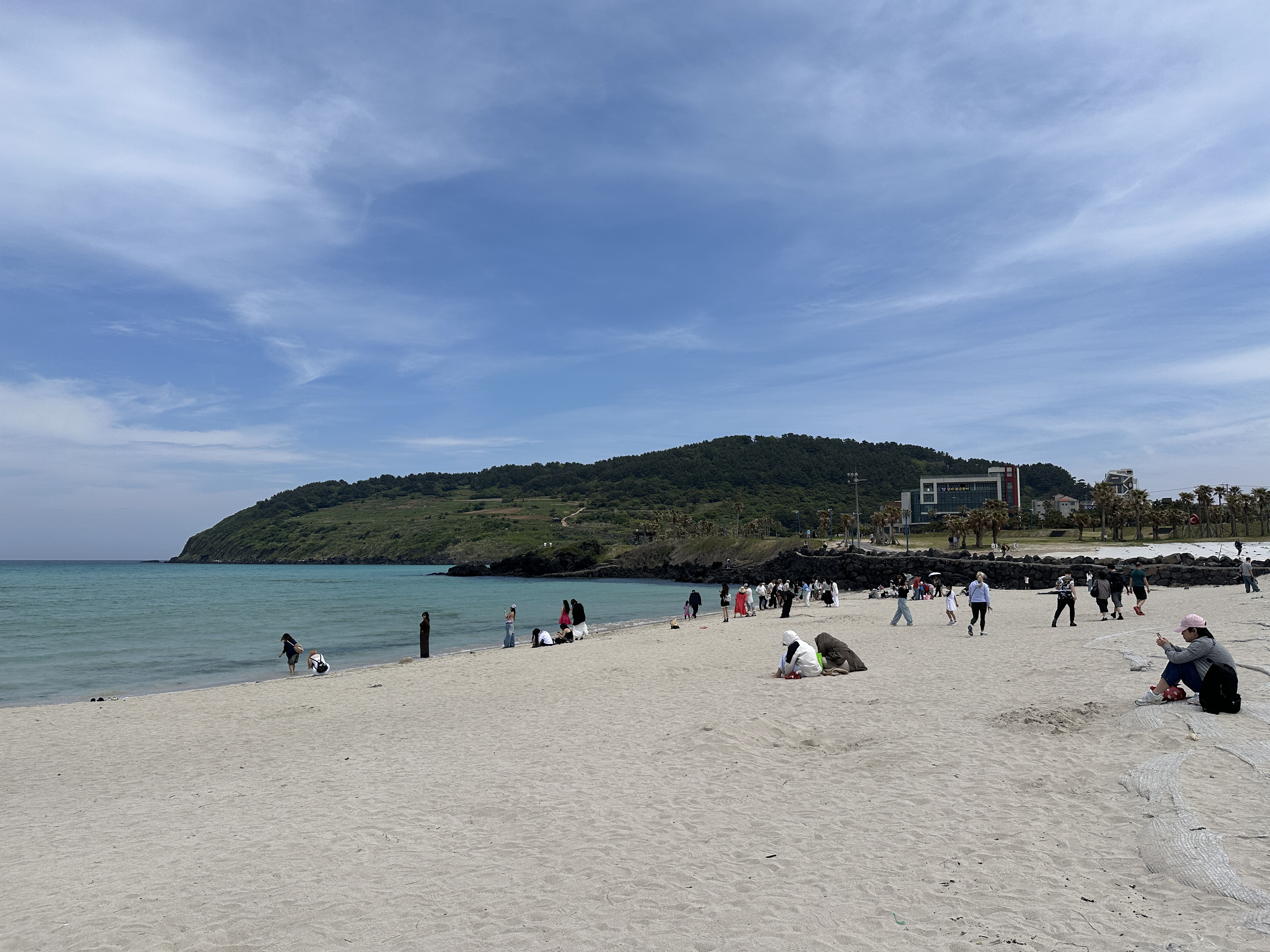
- Main section of the beach (2026)
- Interactive map of Hamdeok Beach
- Coordinates: 33.543°N 126.669°E
- Location: Hamdeok Village, Jocheon, Jeju City, Jeju Province, South Korea

Korean name
- Hangul: 함덕해수욕장
- RR: Hamdeok haesuyokjang
- MR: Hamdŏk haesuyokchang

Hamdeok Beach (Korean: 함덕해수욕장), also called Hamdeok Seoubong Beach (함덕 서우봉 해변), is a beach in Hamdeok Village, Jocheon, Jeju City, Jeju Province, South Korea. It is known for its white sands, and is the most popular beach for tourists in Jeju.

The beach is highly popular with tourists and has been described as "Korea's Maldives". For the 2025 season, the beach received 703,064 visitors, more than half of the total visitors to all beaches in Jeju (1.2 million).

Near the beach are numerous stores, restaurants, bars, cafes, and bakeries for tourists. In winter 2025, the beach began hosting an annual winter festival, where various Christmas-themed decorations are installed at the beach. Also nearby is the oreum (small extinct volcano) Seoubong. The beach is one stop along the Jeju Olle Trail.

== Gallery ==
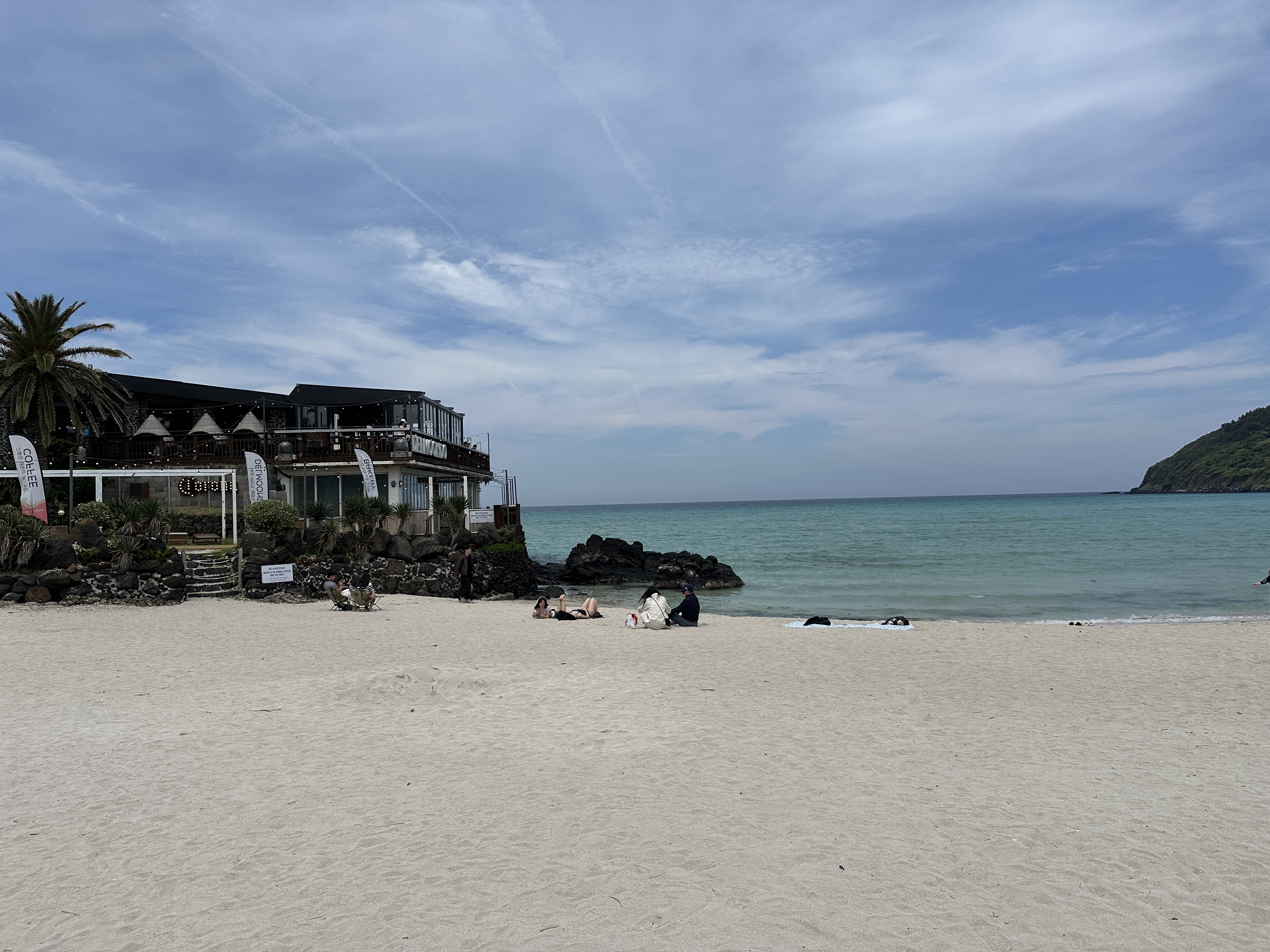
Cafe on the beach (2026)

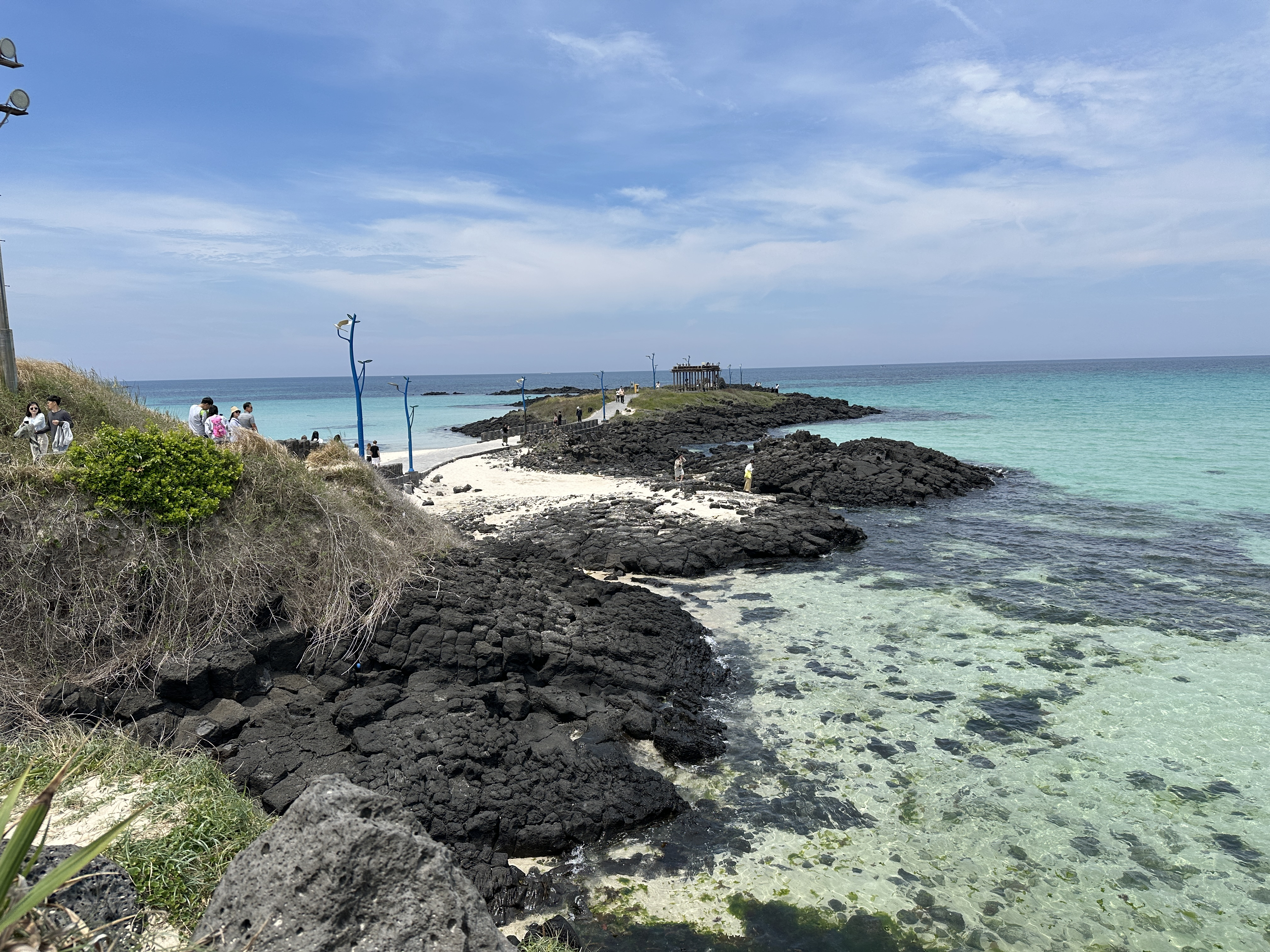
Peninsula with walking paths and tables next to the beach (2026)

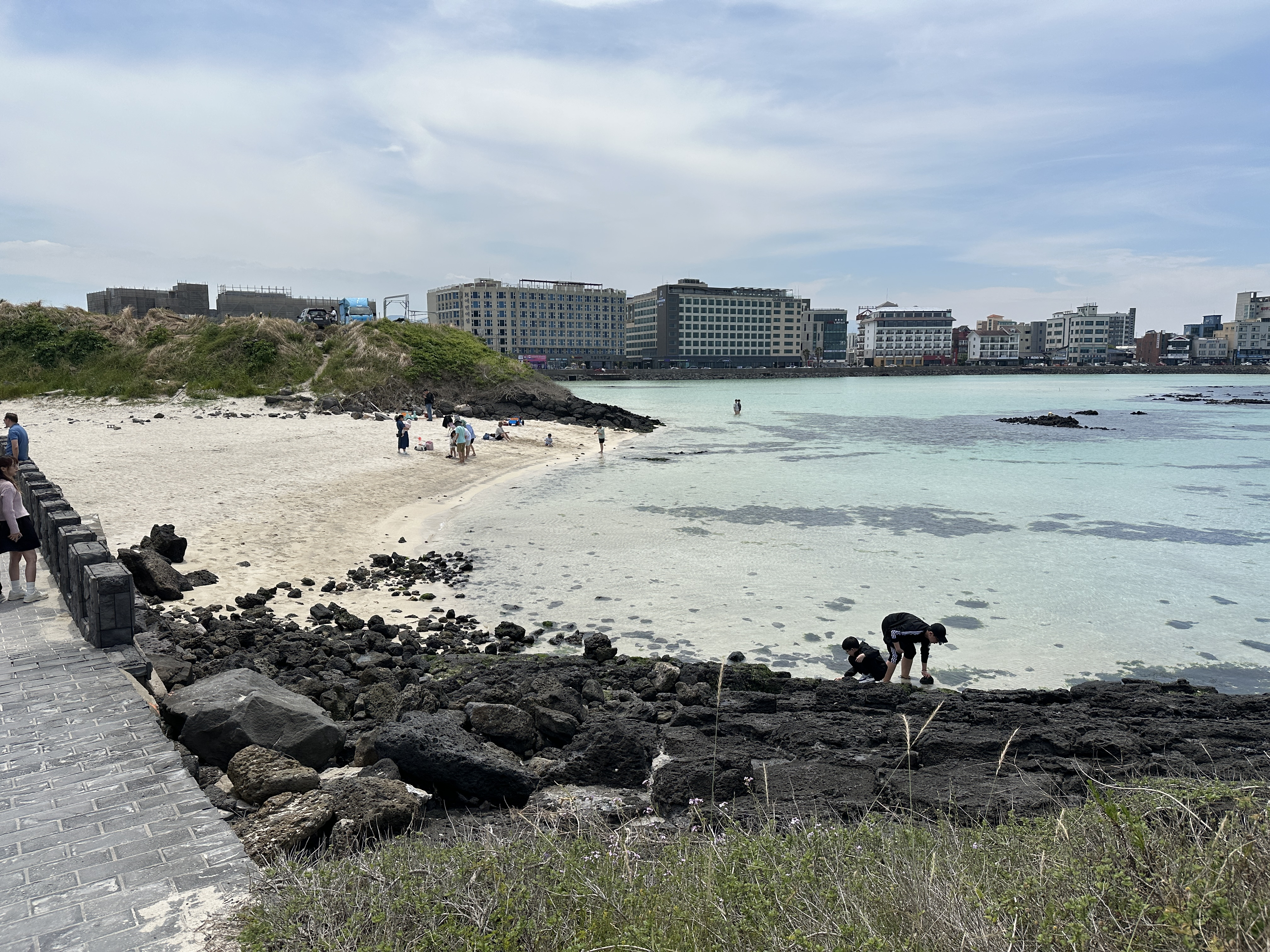
Smaller section of beach on the peninsula (2026)

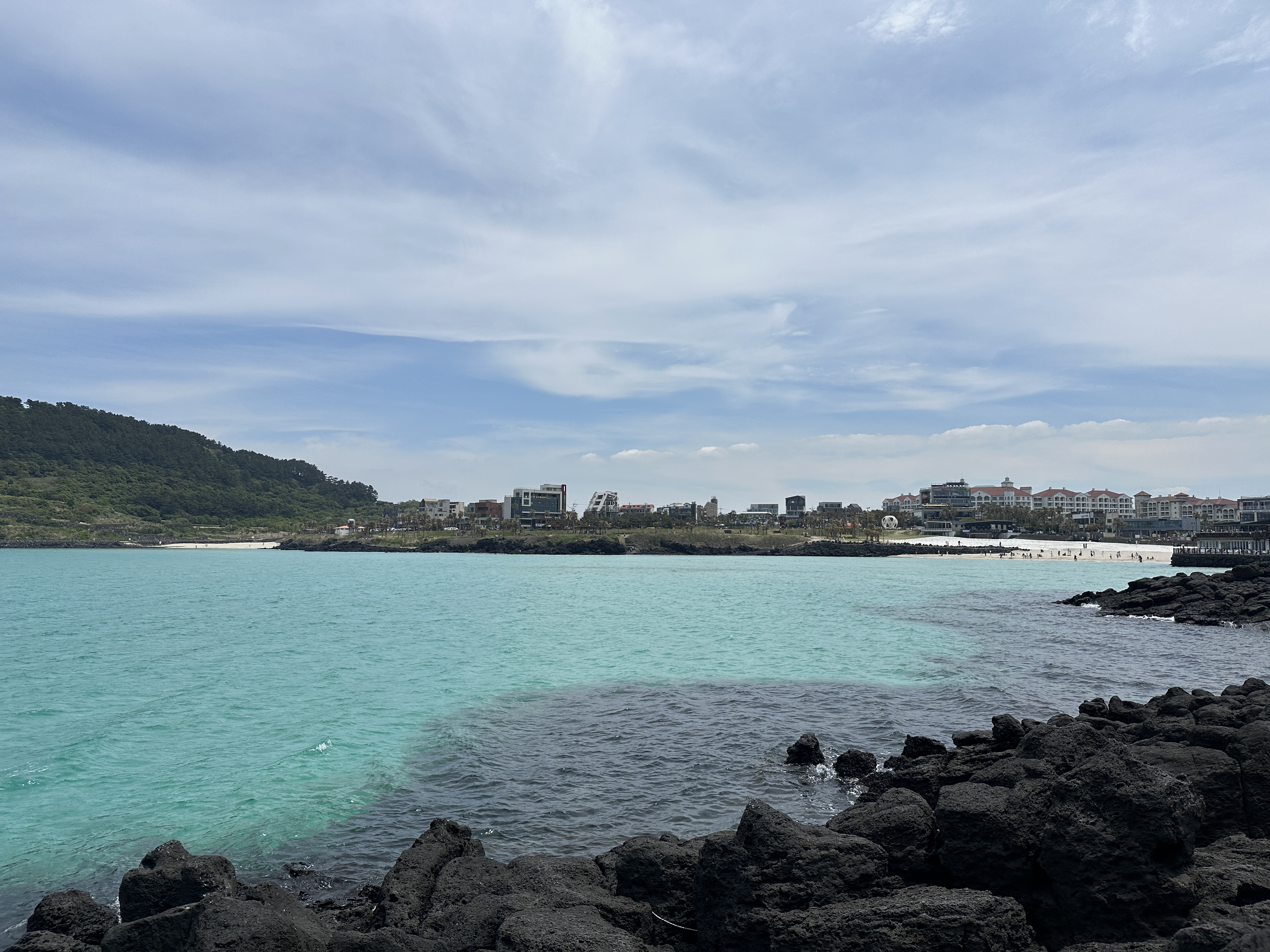
View from the peninsula; main section of beach on right, another section on left (2026)

== See also ==
- List of beaches in Jeju Province
