= Jeongmul Oreum =

Mountain in Jeju Province, South Korea

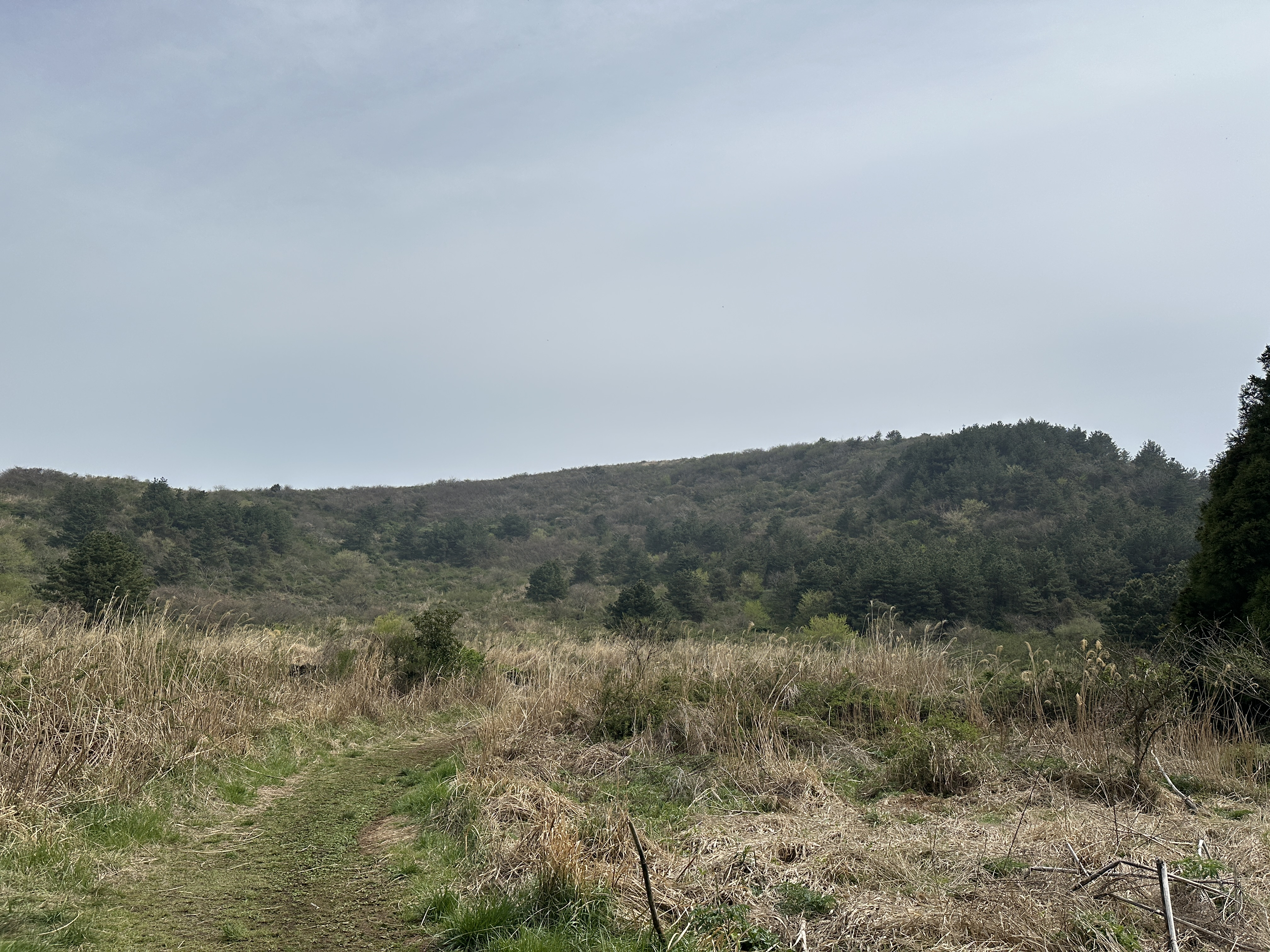
- View of the mountain from the base (2026)

Highest point
- Coordinates: 33.3384°N 126.3295°E

Geography

Korean name
- Hangul: 정물오름
- RR: Jeongmuroreum
- MR: Chŏngmurorŭm

Jeongmul Oreum (Korean: 정물오름) is an oreum (small extinct volcano) in Hallim, Jeju City, Jeju Province, South Korea.

The mountain has gone by this name since antiquity. Its name refers to a spring called "Jeongmulsaem" (정물샘) that is on its northwestern slope. Its name was translated into Hanja as "Jeongsuak" (정수악; 井水岳).

The mountain is 466.1m tall, a circumference of 2,743m, and area of 494,293m^{2}.

There is a popular hiking trail up to the summit that takes around 10 to 20 minutes to complete. It is considered to have scenic panoramic views of the surrounding area, including of the island's main mountain Hallasan.

== Gallery ==
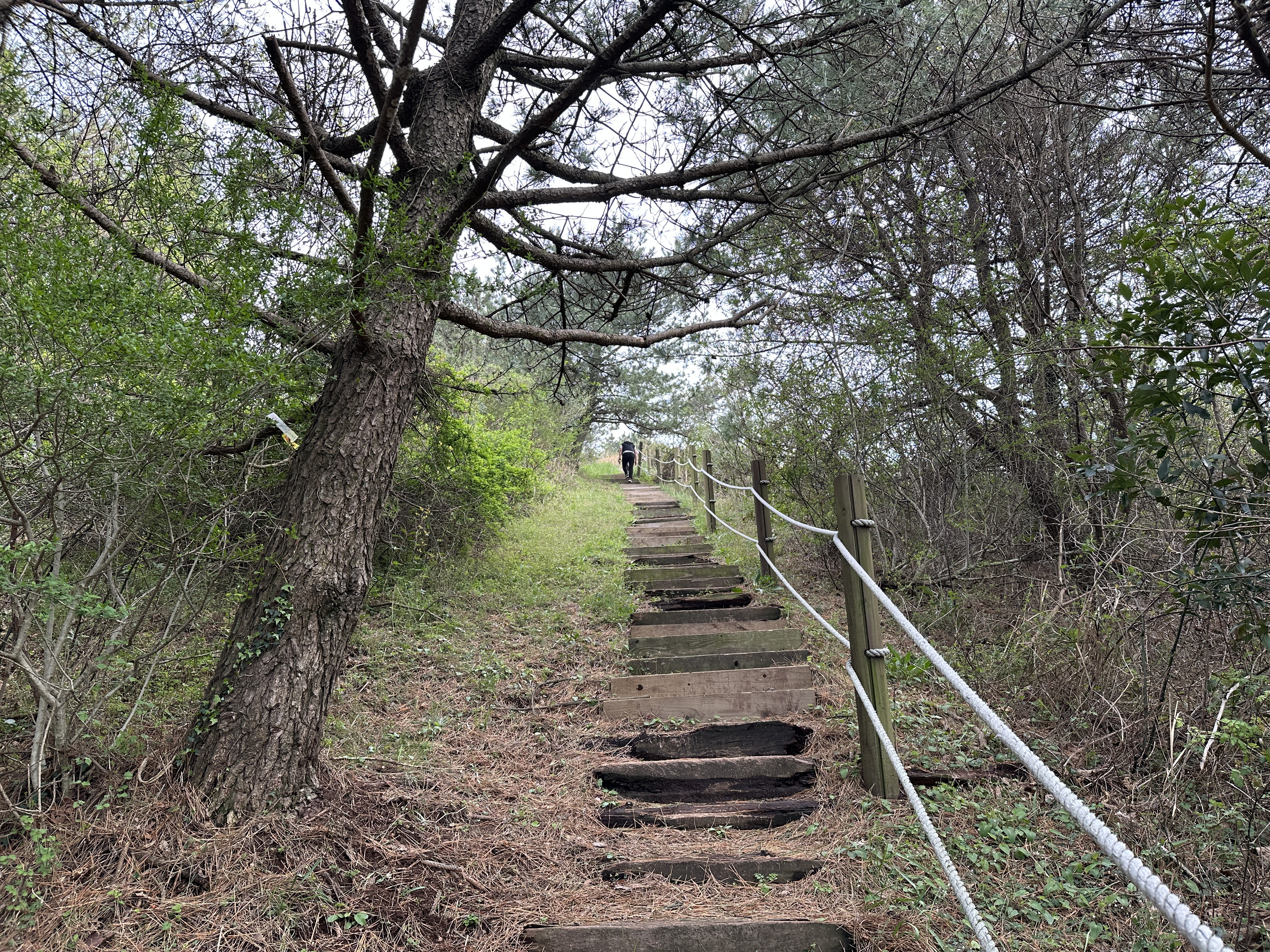
A trail up the mountain (2026)

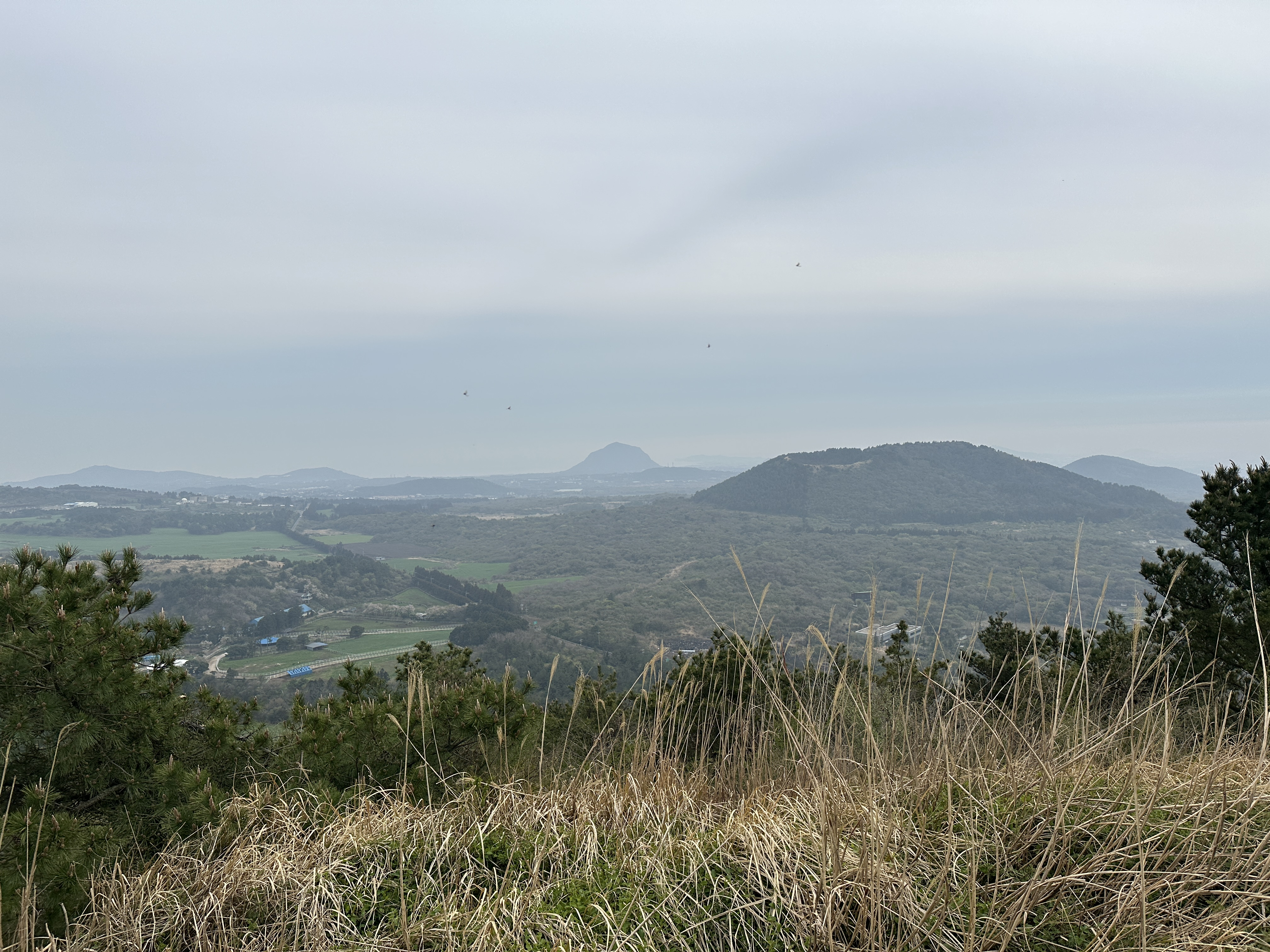
View from the top (2026)

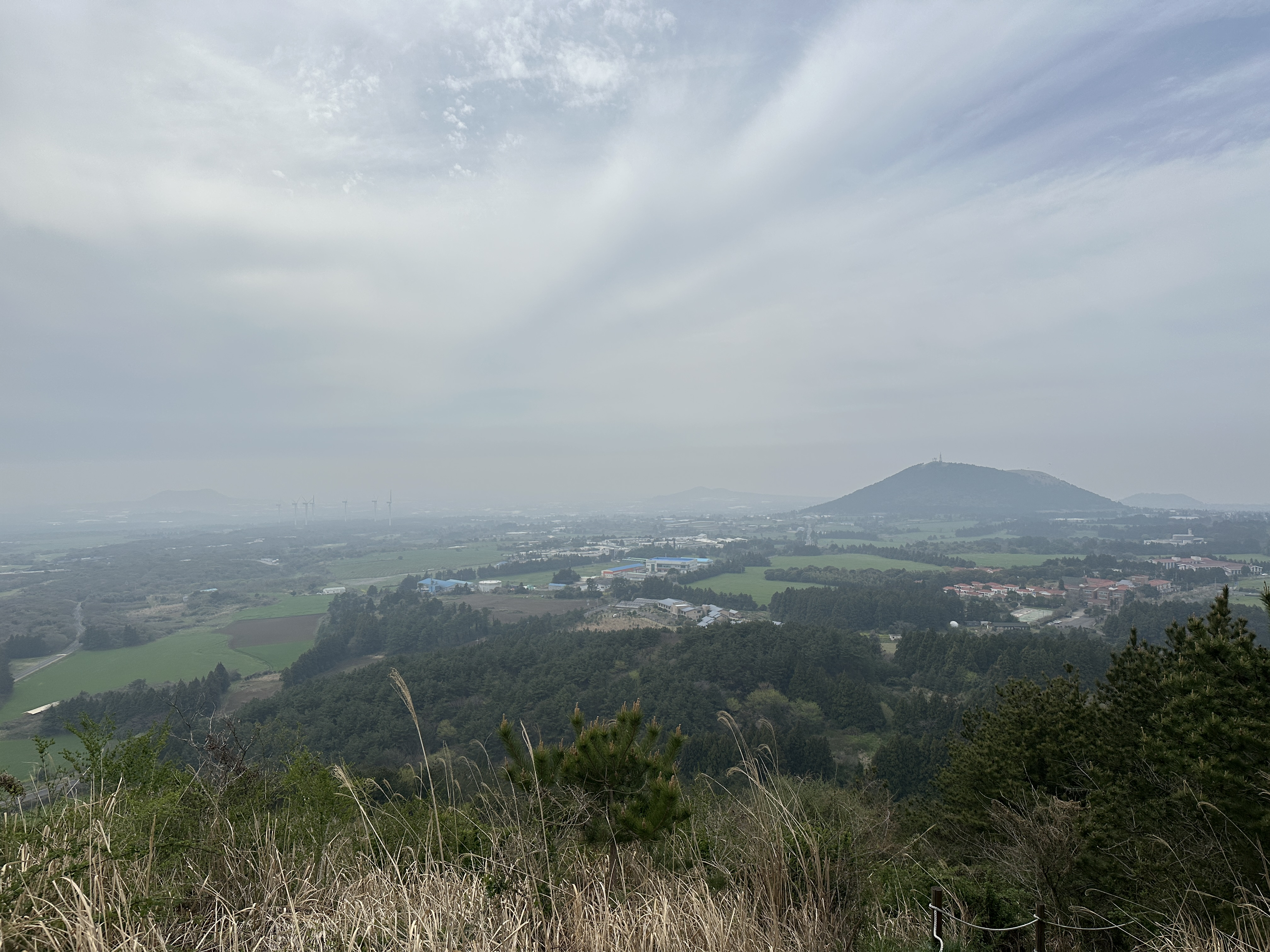
View from the top (2026)
