= Myeongwol Elementary School =

Cafe and gallery in Jeju, South Korea

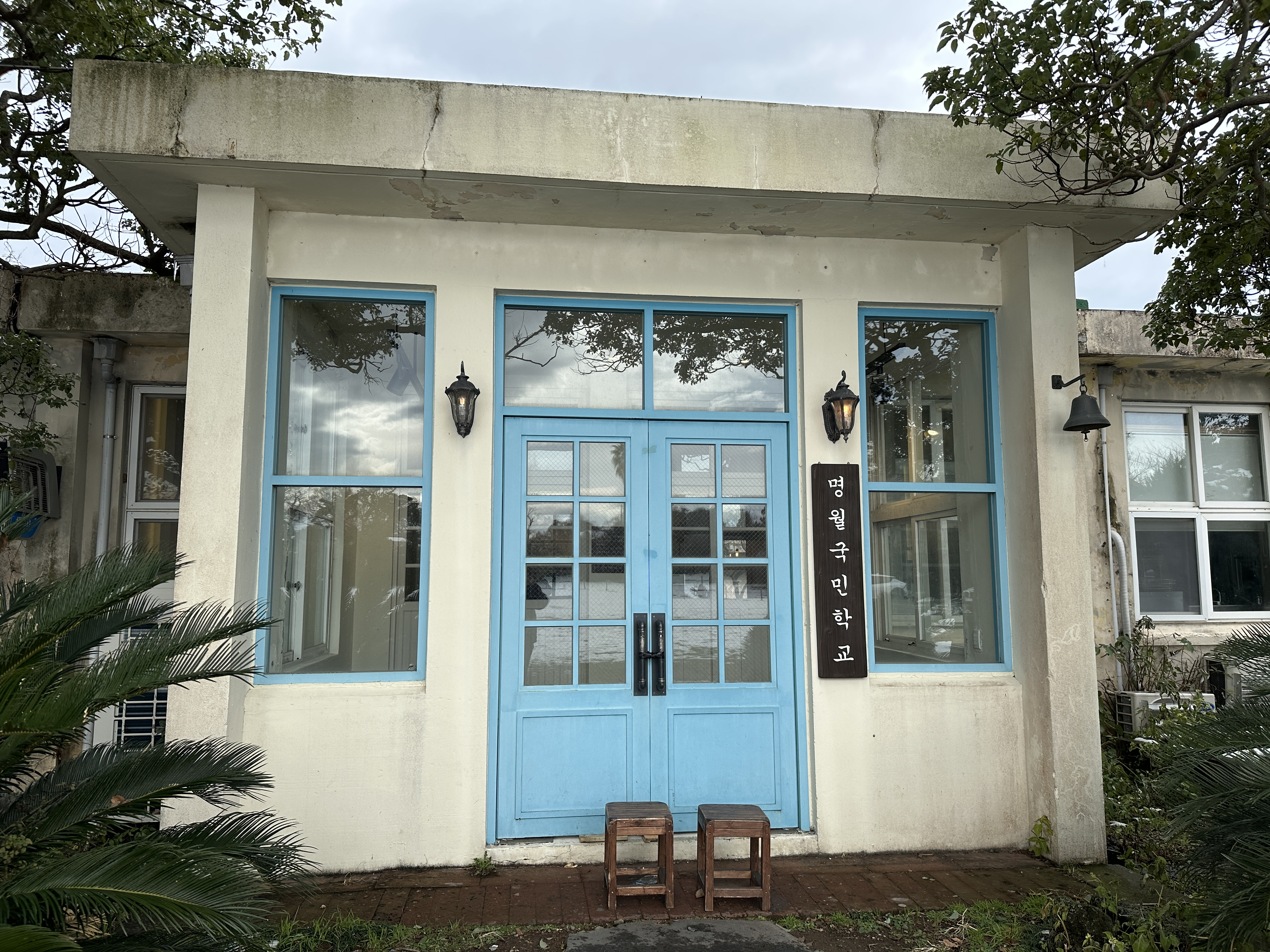
- Interactive map of the Myeongwol Elementary School area

General information
- Location: 48 Myeongwol-ro, Hallim-eup, Jeju City, Jeju Province, South Korea
- Coordinates: 33.3887°N 126.2648°E
- Opened: 1955

Design and construction
- Known for: Former school, now cafe and gallery

Website
- https://www.instagram.com/_lightmoon.official/

Myeongwol Elementary School (Korean: 명월국민학교; Hanja: 明月國民學校) is a former school and then a cafe and gallery in Myeongwol-ri, Hallim-eup, Jeju City, South Korea. It has since ceased operating as such in January 2025.

The school operated as a local elementary school from 1955 until March 1993. After the school closed, the facilities were used for events and celebrations. In 2018, the local Myeongwol-ri Village Association acquired an interest-free loan to renovate the facilities. It was permanently converted into a cafe and gallery that maintained the original name of the school, as a tribute to its role in the community. It opened in September 2018, and has since become a popular tourist attraction.

Each room is named as if it is a classroom; as an example, the cafe room is called "Coffee Class" (커피반). Other rooms include a stationary store and a gallery. Nostalgic goods and candies from the times that the school operated are sold. Each Monday, a flea market is held on the facilities. Pop-up stores have been hosted in the building, with one from the company Polaroid being hosted in March 2022. Outside the main building, there is a garden and playground.

Profits from building are used to improve the overall village.

== Gallery ==
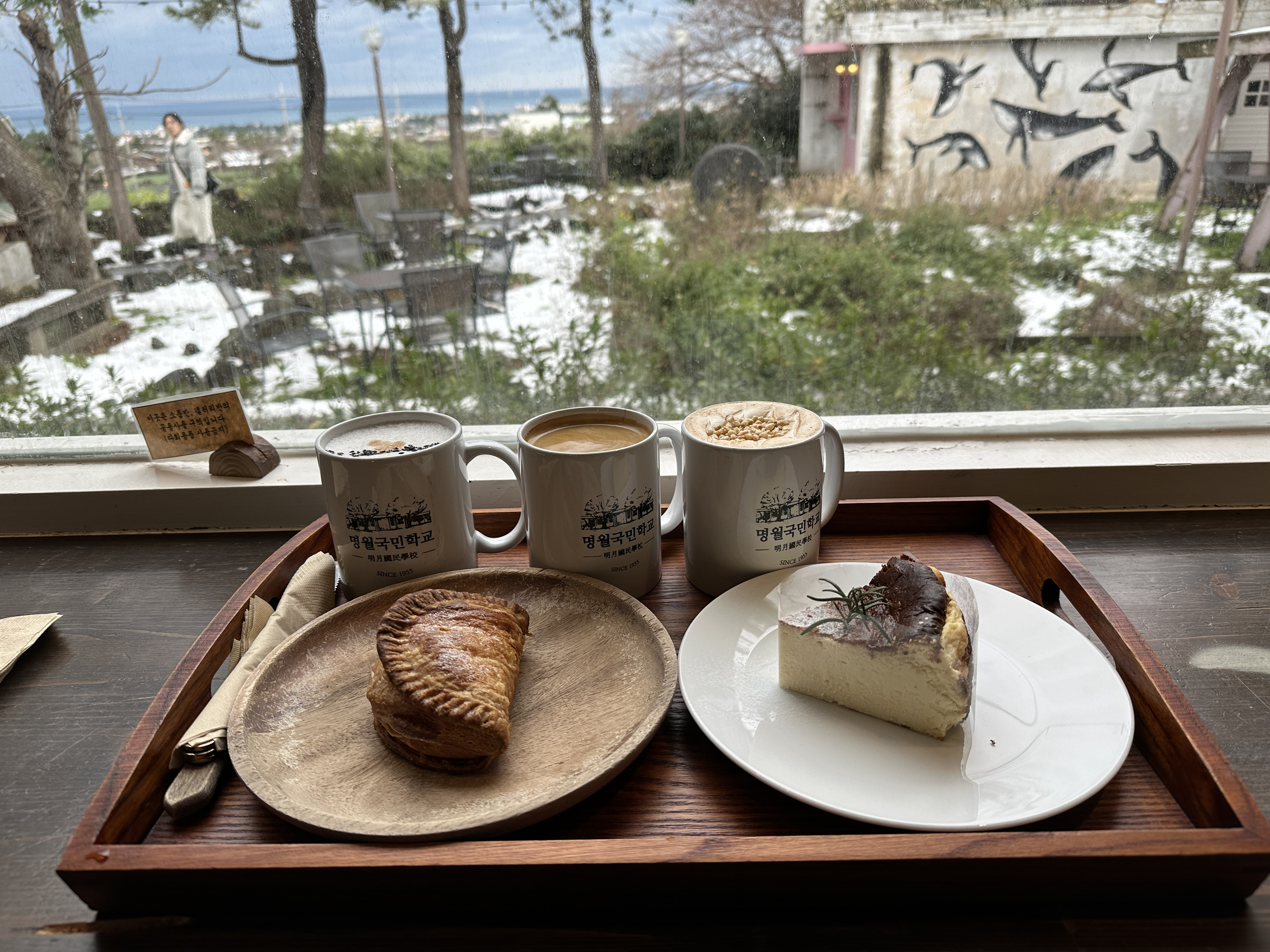
Food and drinks from the cafe, with rear garden visible outside (2023)

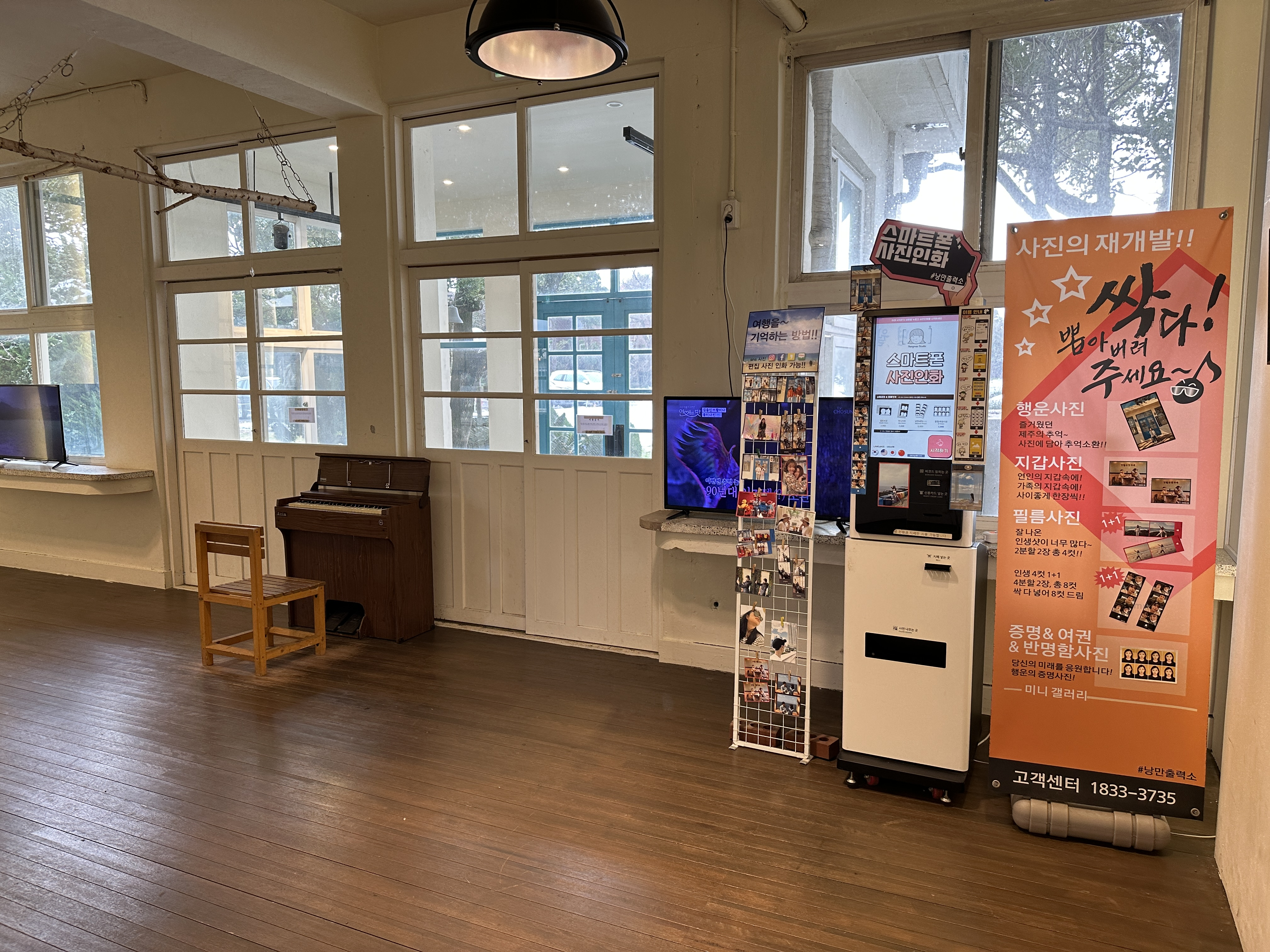
Interior of the gallery room, with a foot-powered organ (2023)
