= Hallim Park =

Park in Jeju City, South Korea

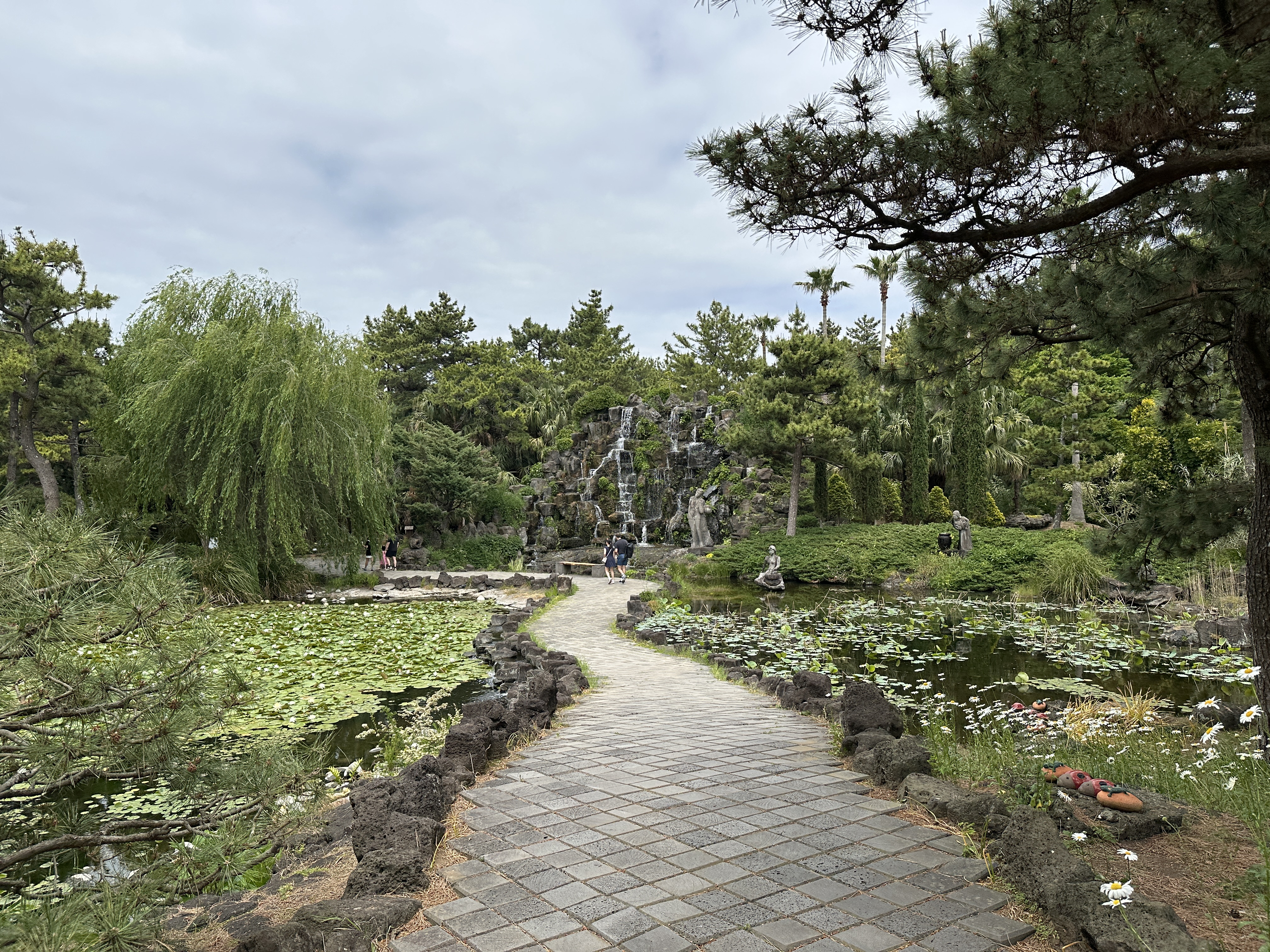
- Part of the park (2026)
- Interactive map of Hallim Park
- Location: Hallim, Jeju City, Jeju Province, South Korea
- Coordinates: 33.3892°N 126.2403°E
- Area: 112,397 square metres (1,209,830 ft^{2})
- Created: October 10, 1971
- Founder: Song Bong-gyu
- Website: hallimpark.com

Korean name
- Hangul: 한림공원
- RR: Hallim gongwon
- MR: Hallim kongwŏn

Hallim Park (Korean: 한림공원) is a park in Hallim, Jeju City, Jeju Province, South Korea. It was established on October 10, 1971. The park was founded by local Song Bong-gyu (송봉규; 1931–2023), who developed it from barren land to the present state.

The park contains the lava caves Hyeopjae (협재굴) and Ssangryong (쌍룡굴; alternatively Ssangnyong or Ssangyong; 쌍용굴). They are designated Natural Monuments of South Korea.

== Description ==
The park has an area of 112,397 m^{2}. It has 9 themed areas and has a variety of shops, restaurants, and cafes. It also contains the lava caves Hyeopjae and Ssangryong.

The park contains numerous local and imported plants and animals. Famously, the park has a number of freeroaming peacocks. Especially due to the greenhouses, the park has plants blooming year round and is popular with visitors even during the winter.

== History ==
Founder Song Bong-gyu grew up in the area. He developed a passion for plant life while he was in elementary school. In 1971, he liquidated his father's estate and purchased 300,000 m^{2} of relatively barren sandy land that became the basis of the park. While he wanted to make it a tourist attraction, he initially did not receive permission to do so. In the meantime, he worked on developing the land. In 1982, he received various construction permits for tourist buildings. In 1985, Japanese engineers were invited to construct a 695 m^{2} greenhouse in the area; the first greenhouse on Jeju. In the following years, the herb garden, plum blossom garden, topiary garden, wild herb garden, cactus garden, and daffodil garden were established, in that order. Various foreign dignitaries have donated plants that are now displayed in the garden.

== Gallery ==
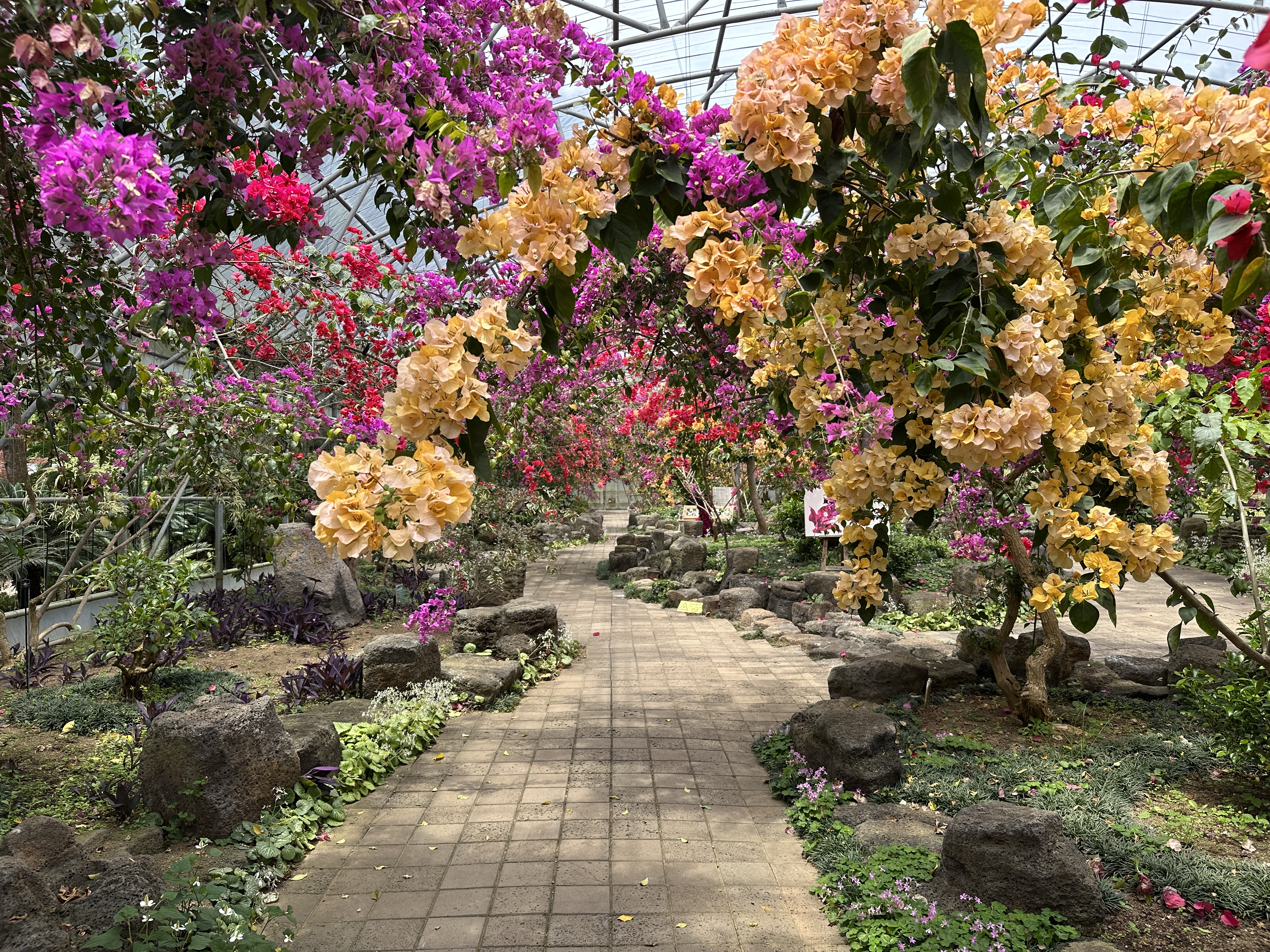
Bougainvillea garden in greenhouse (2026)

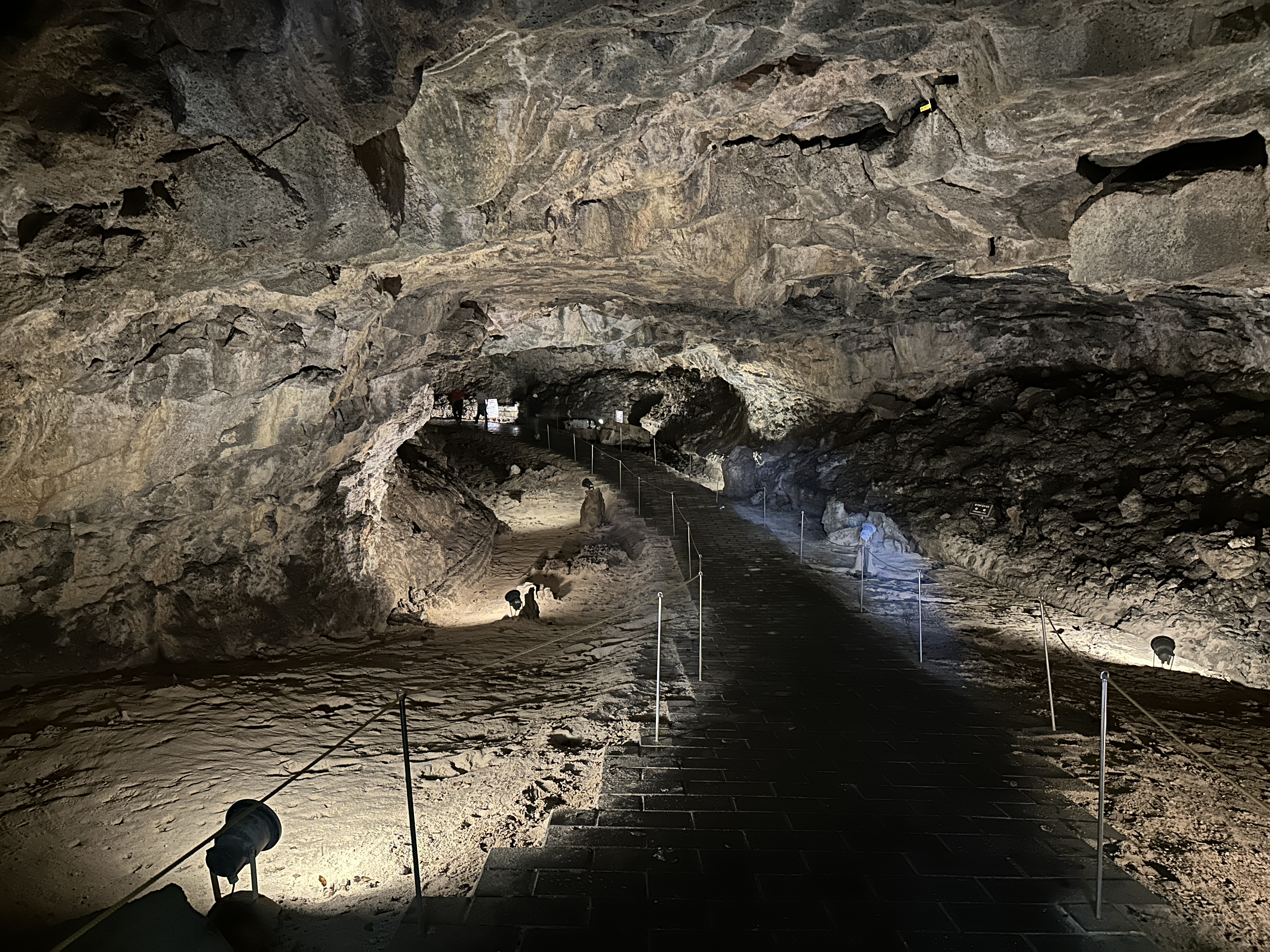
Ssangryong Cave (2026)

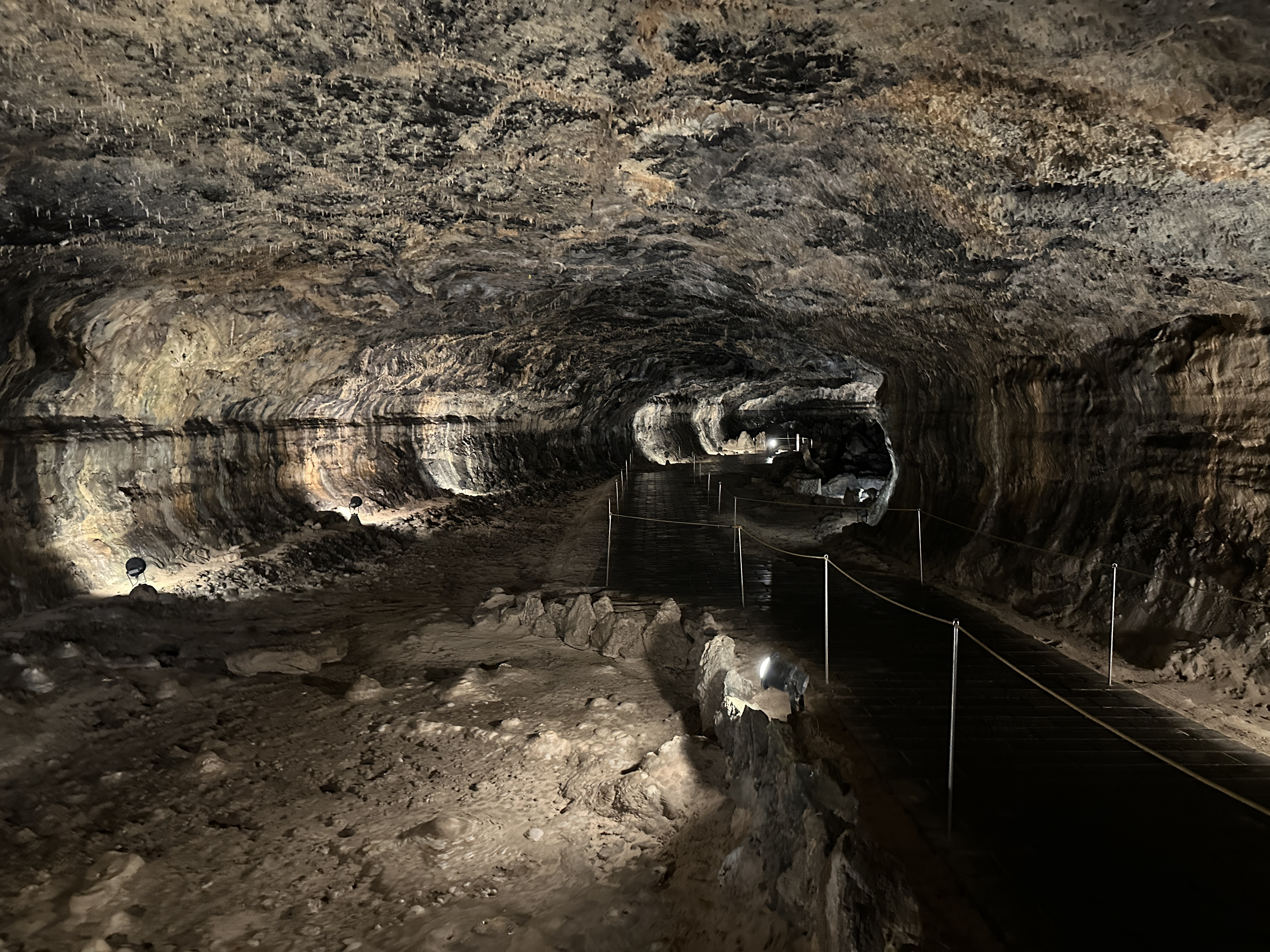
Hyeopjae Cave (2026)

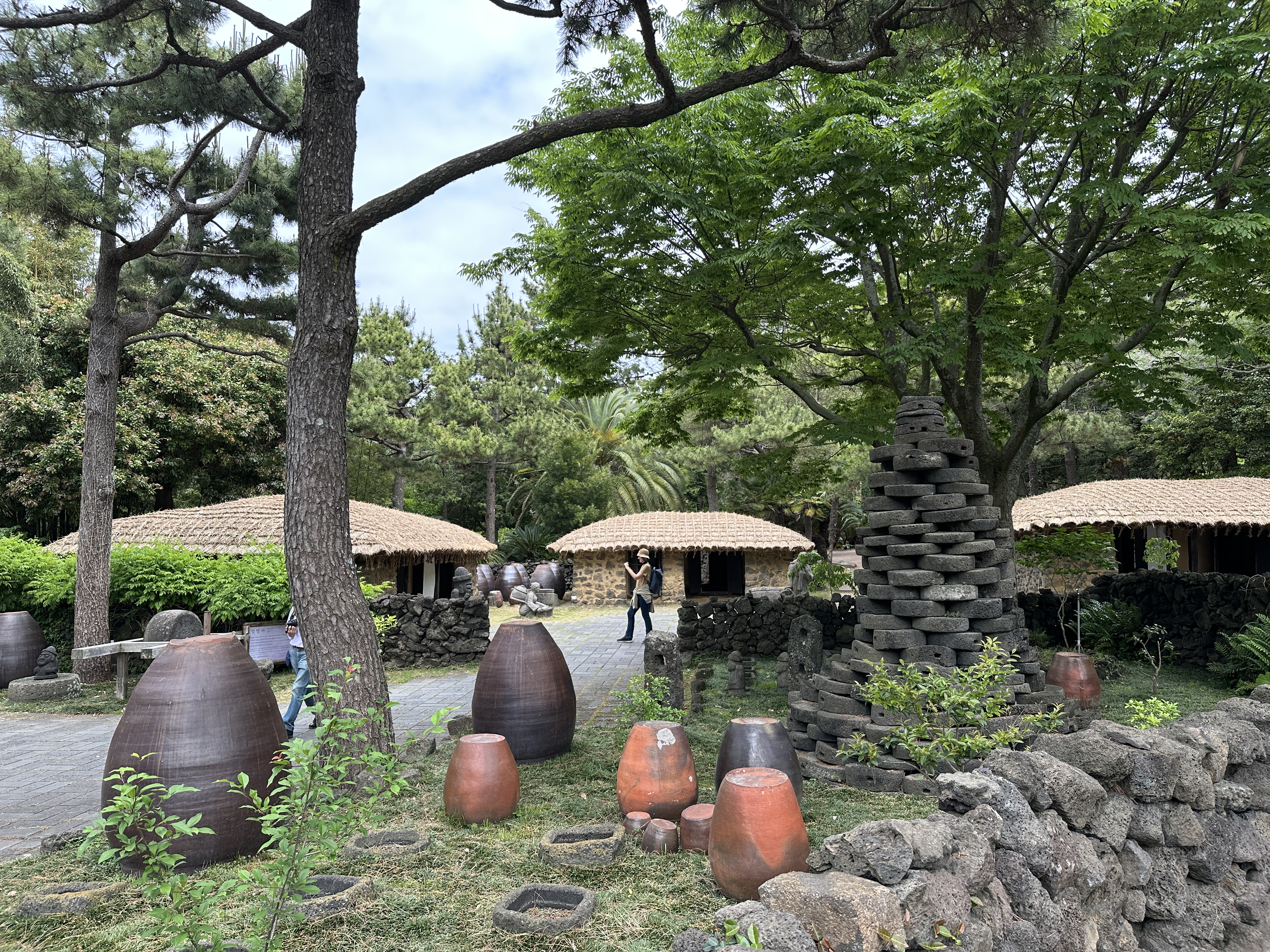
Jae-Am Folk Village inside the park (2026)

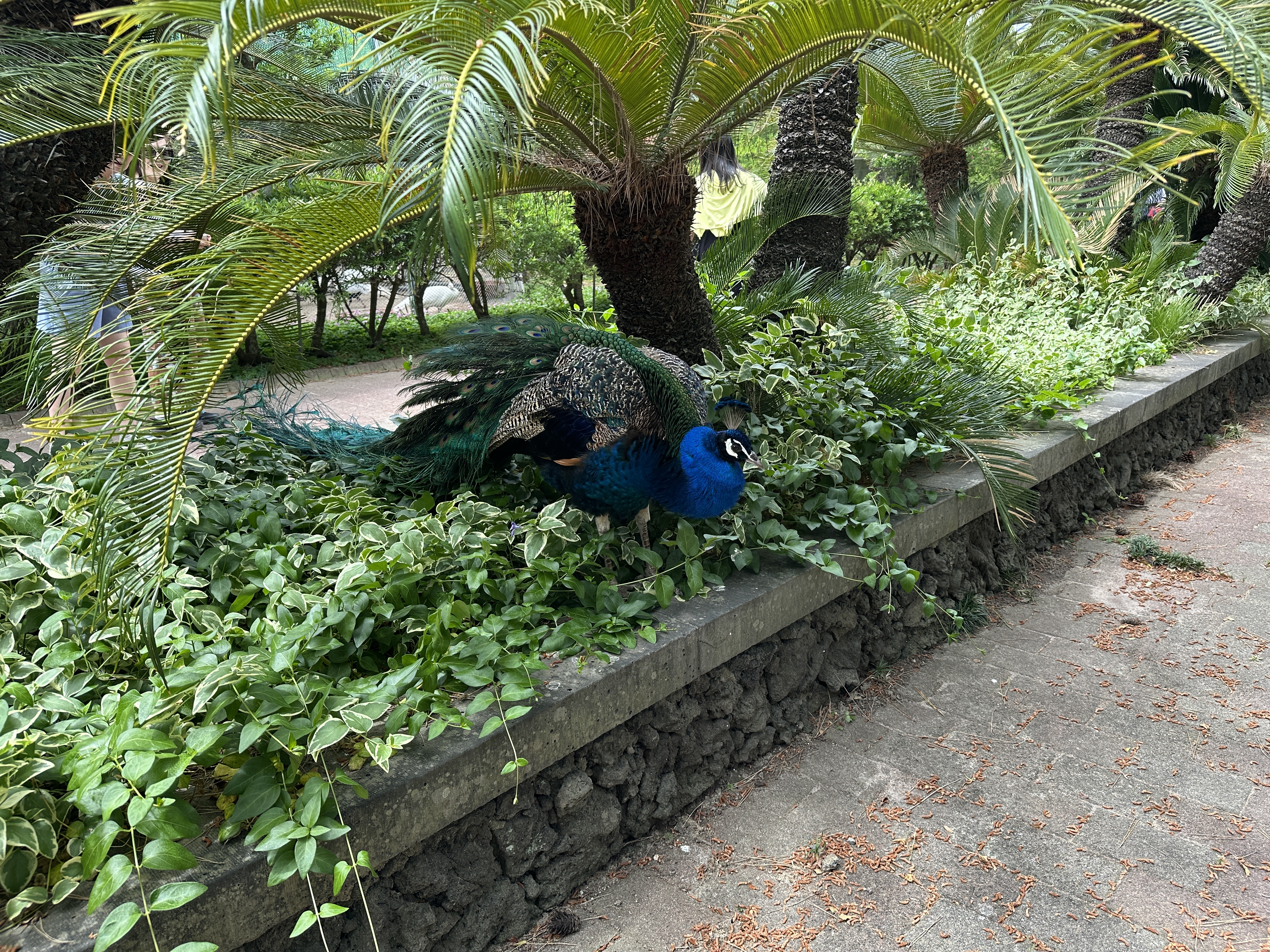
A freeroaming peacock (2026)

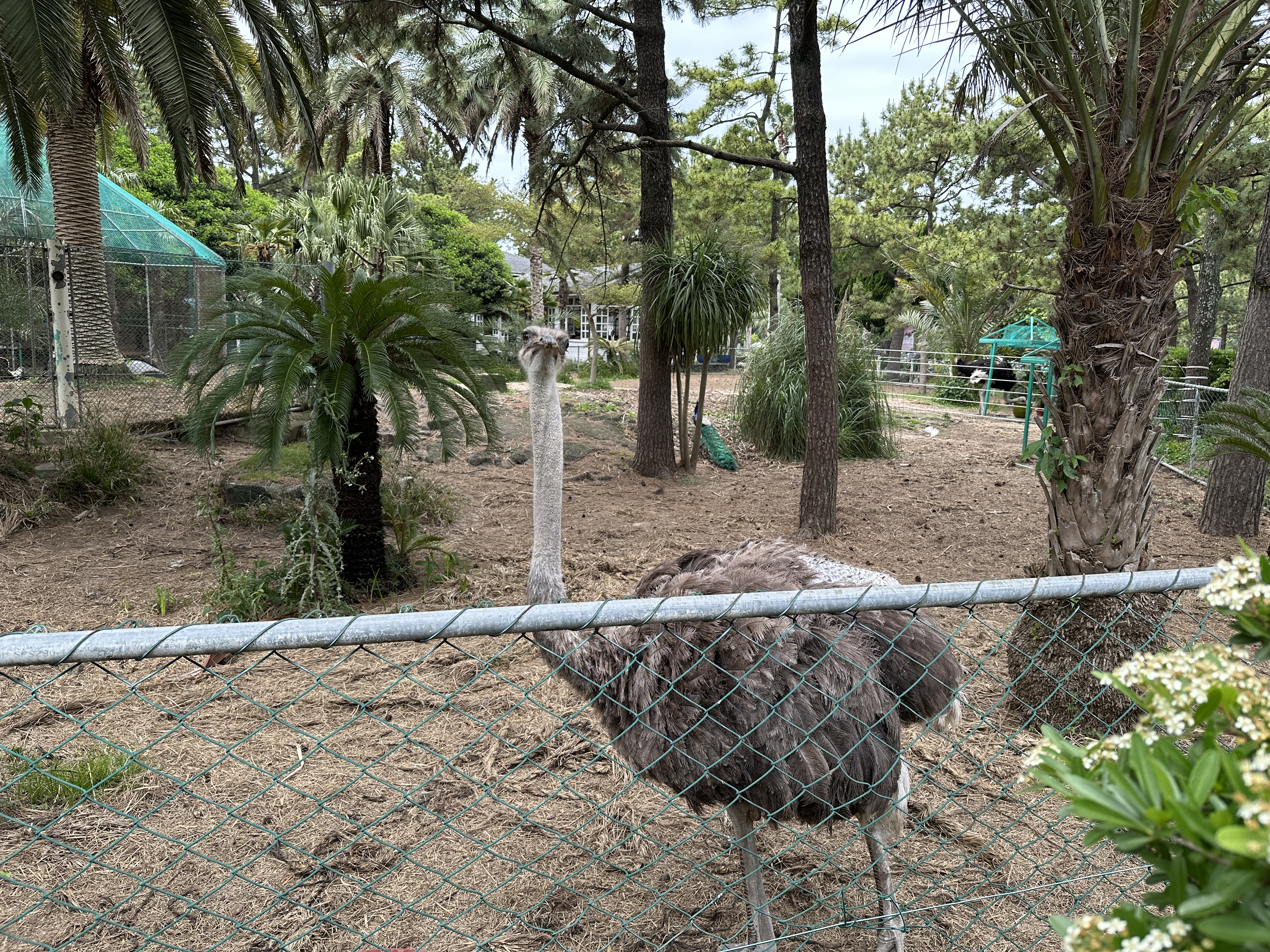
Ostrich (2026)
