= Hallim =

Town in South Korea

- eup
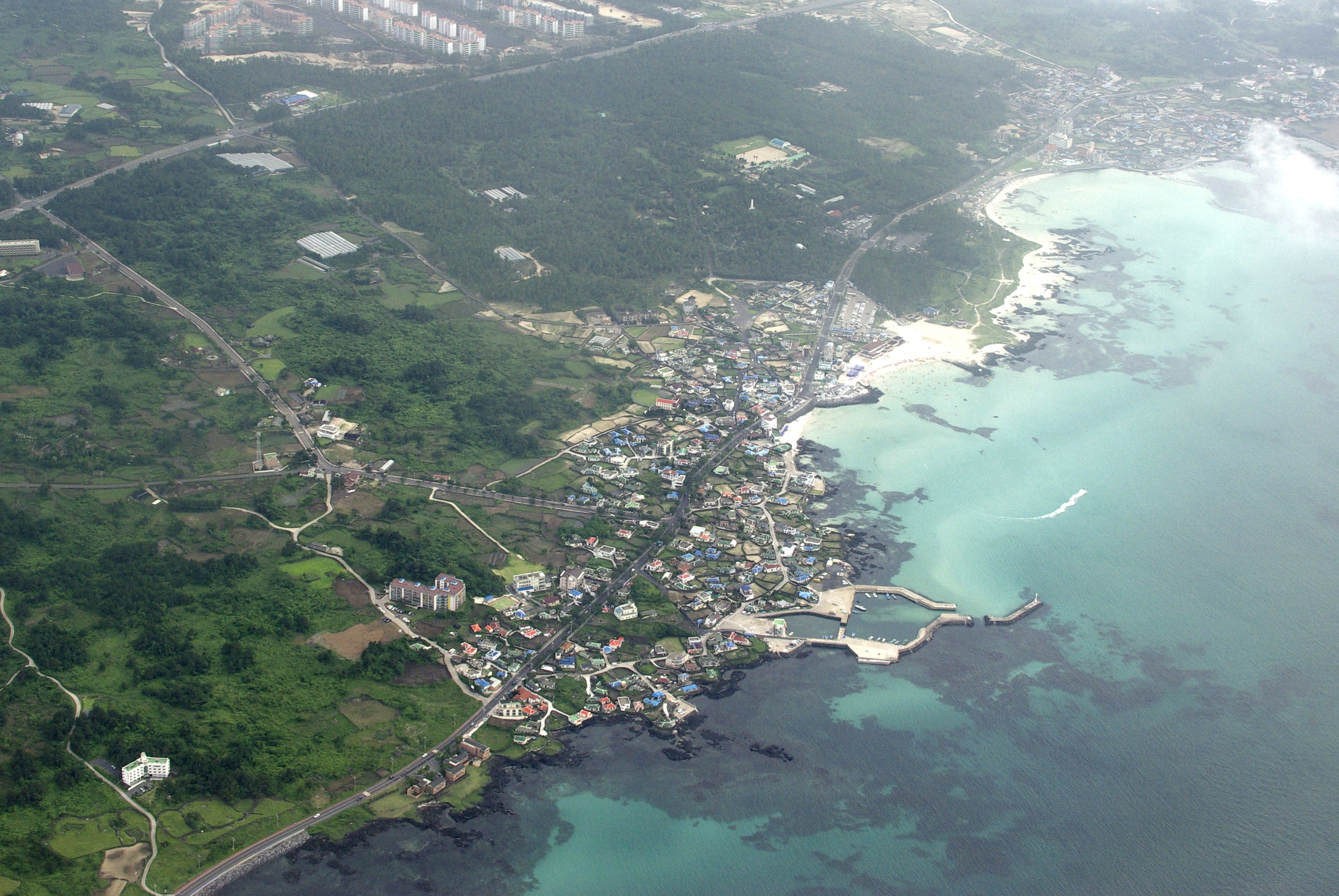

- Location within South Korea
- Coordinates: 33°22′22.58″N 126°16′57.90″E
- Country: South Korea

Area
  - Total: 91.09 km^{2} (35.17 sq mi)

Population (December 2023)
  - Total: 20,910
  - Density: 229.6/km^{2} (594.5/sq mi)
- Dialect: Jeju

Korean name
- Hangul: 한림읍
- Hanja: 翰林邑
- RR: Hallim-eup
- MR: Hallim-ŭp

Hallim (Korean: 한림읍) is a town located in Jeju City, Jeju Province, South Korea. The population of Hallim is 20,910 people and 10,737 households (10,776 men and 10,134 women, as of December 2023).

The island Biyangdo is administered as part of Hallim.

== Tourism ==
=== Nature ===
Hyeopjae Beach is a popular tourist attraction.

=== Cultural facilities ===
Hallim Park is a major tourist attraction in the area.

In Hallim's Myeongwol-ri, there is the Myeongwol Elementary School, which has since been converted into a cafe and gallery.
